

514001–514100 

|-bgcolor=#E9E9E9
| 514001 ||  || — || February 27, 2014 || Mount Lemmon || Mount Lemmon Survey || EUN || align=right | 1.1 km || 
|-id=002 bgcolor=#E9E9E9
| 514002 ||  || — || January 10, 2013 || Haleakala || Pan-STARRS ||  || align=right | 2.1 km || 
|-id=003 bgcolor=#E9E9E9
| 514003 ||  || — || May 23, 2006 || Mount Lemmon || Mount Lemmon Survey ||  || align=right data-sort-value="0.75" | 750 m || 
|-id=004 bgcolor=#E9E9E9
| 514004 ||  || — || March 3, 2009 || Mount Lemmon || Mount Lemmon Survey || NEM || align=right | 1.9 km || 
|-id=005 bgcolor=#E9E9E9
| 514005 ||  || — || May 3, 2014 || Mount Lemmon || Mount Lemmon Survey ||  || align=right | 2.0 km || 
|-id=006 bgcolor=#E9E9E9
| 514006 ||  || — || April 24, 2014 || Haleakala || Pan-STARRS ||  || align=right | 1.9 km || 
|-id=007 bgcolor=#d6d6d6
| 514007 ||  || — || February 28, 2008 || Mount Lemmon || Mount Lemmon Survey ||  || align=right | 2.0 km || 
|-id=008 bgcolor=#d6d6d6
| 514008 ||  || — || May 5, 2014 || Mount Lemmon || Mount Lemmon Survey ||  || align=right | 3.3 km || 
|-id=009 bgcolor=#E9E9E9
| 514009 ||  || — || May 9, 2014 || Mount Lemmon || Mount Lemmon Survey ||  || align=right | 2.0 km || 
|-id=010 bgcolor=#E9E9E9
| 514010 ||  || — || December 3, 2008 || Kitt Peak || Spacewatch ||  || align=right | 1.2 km || 
|-id=011 bgcolor=#d6d6d6
| 514011 ||  || — || April 24, 2014 || Kitt Peak || Spacewatch ||  || align=right | 2.5 km || 
|-id=012 bgcolor=#E9E9E9
| 514012 ||  || — || March 4, 1997 || Kitt Peak || Spacewatch ||  || align=right | 1.2 km || 
|-id=013 bgcolor=#E9E9E9
| 514013 ||  || — || July 18, 2006 || Siding Spring || SSS ||  || align=right | 2.4 km || 
|-id=014 bgcolor=#E9E9E9
| 514014 ||  || — || January 25, 2009 || Kitt Peak || Spacewatch ||  || align=right | 1.4 km || 
|-id=015 bgcolor=#E9E9E9
| 514015 ||  || — || May 10, 2014 || Haleakala || Pan-STARRS ||  || align=right | 1.9 km || 
|-id=016 bgcolor=#d6d6d6
| 514016 ||  || — || February 10, 2007 || Mount Lemmon || Mount Lemmon Survey ||  || align=right | 2.9 km || 
|-id=017 bgcolor=#d6d6d6
| 514017 ||  || — || May 6, 2014 || Haleakala || Pan-STARRS ||  || align=right | 2.2 km || 
|-id=018 bgcolor=#d6d6d6
| 514018 ||  || — || February 10, 2007 || Mount Lemmon || Mount Lemmon Survey ||  || align=right | 2.5 km || 
|-id=019 bgcolor=#d6d6d6
| 514019 ||  || — || May 30, 2009 || Mount Lemmon || Mount Lemmon Survey ||  || align=right | 2.4 km || 
|-id=020 bgcolor=#d6d6d6
| 514020 ||  || — || June 27, 2010 || WISE || WISE ||  || align=right | 4.5 km || 
|-id=021 bgcolor=#d6d6d6
| 514021 ||  || — || February 3, 2008 || Kitt Peak || Spacewatch ||  || align=right | 2.4 km || 
|-id=022 bgcolor=#E9E9E9
| 514022 ||  || — || April 5, 2014 || Haleakala || Pan-STARRS ||  || align=right | 1.2 km || 
|-id=023 bgcolor=#E9E9E9
| 514023 ||  || — || October 26, 2011 || Haleakala || Pan-STARRS ||  || align=right | 2.4 km || 
|-id=024 bgcolor=#E9E9E9
| 514024 ||  || — || December 21, 2008 || Mount Lemmon || Mount Lemmon Survey ||  || align=right | 1.1 km || 
|-id=025 bgcolor=#d6d6d6
| 514025 ||  || — || April 4, 2008 || Mount Lemmon || Mount Lemmon Survey || VER || align=right | 2.7 km || 
|-id=026 bgcolor=#E9E9E9
| 514026 ||  || — || February 3, 2009 || Kitt Peak || Spacewatch ||  || align=right | 1.4 km || 
|-id=027 bgcolor=#d6d6d6
| 514027 ||  || — || February 28, 2014 || Haleakala || Pan-STARRS ||  || align=right | 3.1 km || 
|-id=028 bgcolor=#E9E9E9
| 514028 ||  || — || May 9, 2005 || Kitt Peak || Spacewatch ||  || align=right | 1.6 km || 
|-id=029 bgcolor=#d6d6d6
| 514029 ||  || — || October 24, 2011 || Mount Lemmon || Mount Lemmon Survey || TEL || align=right | 1.2 km || 
|-id=030 bgcolor=#d6d6d6
| 514030 ||  || — || October 26, 2011 || Haleakala || Pan-STARRS ||  || align=right | 2.5 km || 
|-id=031 bgcolor=#FA8072
| 514031 ||  || — || March 25, 2006 || Siding Spring || SSS ||  || align=right | 1.9 km || 
|-id=032 bgcolor=#d6d6d6
| 514032 ||  || — || May 6, 2014 || Haleakala || Pan-STARRS ||  || align=right | 2.3 km || 
|-id=033 bgcolor=#E9E9E9
| 514033 ||  || — || March 1, 2009 || Kitt Peak || Spacewatch || MRX || align=right data-sort-value="0.87" | 870 m || 
|-id=034 bgcolor=#d6d6d6
| 514034 ||  || — || December 21, 2006 || Mount Lemmon || Mount Lemmon Survey ||  || align=right | 3.7 km || 
|-id=035 bgcolor=#E9E9E9
| 514035 ||  || — || April 2, 2009 || Mount Lemmon || Mount Lemmon Survey ||  || align=right | 2.2 km || 
|-id=036 bgcolor=#d6d6d6
| 514036 ||  || — || October 30, 2010 || Mount Lemmon || Mount Lemmon Survey ||  || align=right | 2.8 km || 
|-id=037 bgcolor=#d6d6d6
| 514037 ||  || — || February 17, 2013 || Kitt Peak || Spacewatch ||  || align=right | 2.3 km || 
|-id=038 bgcolor=#d6d6d6
| 514038 ||  || — || September 14, 2009 || Catalina || CSS ||  || align=right | 2.9 km || 
|-id=039 bgcolor=#d6d6d6
| 514039 ||  || — || February 1, 2012 || Mount Lemmon || Mount Lemmon Survey ||  || align=right | 3.0 km || 
|-id=040 bgcolor=#E9E9E9
| 514040 ||  || — || February 14, 2009 || Mount Lemmon || Mount Lemmon Survey ||  || align=right | 1.8 km || 
|-id=041 bgcolor=#FFC2E0
| 514041 ||  || — || June 22, 2014 || WISE || WISE || AMO +1km || align=right | 5.3 km || 
|-id=042 bgcolor=#d6d6d6
| 514042 ||  || — || June 25, 2014 || Mount Lemmon || Mount Lemmon Survey ||  || align=right | 2.7 km || 
|-id=043 bgcolor=#d6d6d6
| 514043 ||  || — || June 18, 2014 || Haleakala || Pan-STARRS ||  || align=right | 3.5 km || 
|-id=044 bgcolor=#fefefe
| 514044 ||  || — || May 25, 2014 || Haleakala || Pan-STARRS || H || align=right data-sort-value="0.72" | 720 m || 
|-id=045 bgcolor=#d6d6d6
| 514045 ||  || — || May 28, 2008 || Mount Lemmon || Mount Lemmon Survey ||  || align=right | 3.4 km || 
|-id=046 bgcolor=#E9E9E9
| 514046 ||  || — || May 18, 2010 || WISE || WISE ||  || align=right | 1.9 km || 
|-id=047 bgcolor=#d6d6d6
| 514047 ||  || — || November 1, 2010 || Mount Lemmon || Mount Lemmon Survey ||  || align=right | 3.5 km || 
|-id=048 bgcolor=#d6d6d6
| 514048 ||  || — || January 10, 2007 || Mount Lemmon || Mount Lemmon Survey ||  || align=right | 2.9 km || 
|-id=049 bgcolor=#d6d6d6
| 514049 ||  || — || March 8, 2013 || Haleakala || Pan-STARRS ||  || align=right | 3.1 km || 
|-id=050 bgcolor=#d6d6d6
| 514050 ||  || — || June 5, 2014 || Haleakala || Pan-STARRS ||  || align=right | 3.0 km || 
|-id=051 bgcolor=#d6d6d6
| 514051 ||  || — || June 4, 2014 || Haleakala || Pan-STARRS ||  || align=right | 3.2 km || 
|-id=052 bgcolor=#d6d6d6
| 514052 ||  || — || April 12, 2013 || Haleakala || Pan-STARRS ||  || align=right | 3.1 km || 
|-id=053 bgcolor=#d6d6d6
| 514053 ||  || — || May 7, 2014 || Haleakala || Pan-STARRS || EOS || align=right | 1.6 km || 
|-id=054 bgcolor=#d6d6d6
| 514054 ||  || — || September 12, 2004 || Kitt Peak || Spacewatch ||  || align=right | 2.7 km || 
|-id=055 bgcolor=#d6d6d6
| 514055 ||  || — || June 28, 2014 || Haleakala || Pan-STARRS ||  || align=right | 2.9 km || 
|-id=056 bgcolor=#d6d6d6
| 514056 ||  || — || March 16, 2013 || Kitt Peak || Spacewatch ||  || align=right | 2.2 km || 
|-id=057 bgcolor=#d6d6d6
| 514057 ||  || — || June 26, 2014 || Haleakala || Pan-STARRS ||  || align=right | 3.3 km || 
|-id=058 bgcolor=#fefefe
| 514058 ||  || — || September 13, 2004 || Socorro || LINEAR || H || align=right data-sort-value="0.71" | 710 m || 
|-id=059 bgcolor=#d6d6d6
| 514059 ||  || — || January 17, 2007 || Kitt Peak || Spacewatch ||  || align=right | 3.1 km || 
|-id=060 bgcolor=#d6d6d6
| 514060 ||  || — || July 3, 2014 || Haleakala || Pan-STARRS ||  || align=right | 2.9 km || 
|-id=061 bgcolor=#d6d6d6
| 514061 ||  || — || January 26, 2012 || Haleakala || Pan-STARRS ||  || align=right | 2.8 km || 
|-id=062 bgcolor=#C2FFFF
| 514062 ||  || — || July 28, 2014 || Haleakala || Pan-STARRS || L5 || align=right | 7.8 km || 
|-id=063 bgcolor=#d6d6d6
| 514063 ||  || — || May 12, 2013 || Haleakala || Pan-STARRS ||  || align=right | 2.4 km || 
|-id=064 bgcolor=#d6d6d6
| 514064 ||  || — || April 17, 2013 || Haleakala || Pan-STARRS ||  || align=right | 2.9 km || 
|-id=065 bgcolor=#d6d6d6
| 514065 ||  || — || February 3, 2012 || Haleakala || Pan-STARRS ||  || align=right | 3.3 km || 
|-id=066 bgcolor=#d6d6d6
| 514066 ||  || — || March 16, 2007 || Catalina || CSS ||  || align=right | 3.2 km || 
|-id=067 bgcolor=#d6d6d6
| 514067 ||  || — || June 5, 2014 || Haleakala || Pan-STARRS ||  || align=right | 2.4 km || 
|-id=068 bgcolor=#d6d6d6
| 514068 ||  || — || April 4, 2013 || Siding Spring || SSS ||  || align=right | 3.2 km || 
|-id=069 bgcolor=#d6d6d6
| 514069 ||  || — || January 26, 2012 || Haleakala || Pan-STARRS ||  || align=right | 2.9 km || 
|-id=070 bgcolor=#d6d6d6
| 514070 ||  || — || May 31, 2014 || Mount Lemmon || Mount Lemmon Survey ||  || align=right | 3.1 km || 
|-id=071 bgcolor=#d6d6d6
| 514071 ||  || — || January 19, 2012 || Haleakala || Pan-STARRS ||  || align=right | 3.5 km || 
|-id=072 bgcolor=#d6d6d6
| 514072 ||  || — || May 1, 2008 || Kitt Peak || Spacewatch ||  || align=right | 2.0 km || 
|-id=073 bgcolor=#d6d6d6
| 514073 ||  || — || February 1, 2006 || Kitt Peak || Spacewatch ||  || align=right | 2.4 km || 
|-id=074 bgcolor=#fefefe
| 514074 ||  || — || September 10, 2004 || Socorro || LINEAR || H || align=right data-sort-value="0.59" | 590 m || 
|-id=075 bgcolor=#d6d6d6
| 514075 ||  || — || June 24, 2014 || Haleakala || Pan-STARRS ||  || align=right | 3.4 km || 
|-id=076 bgcolor=#FA8072
| 514076 ||  || — || September 4, 2014 || Haleakala || Pan-STARRS || H || align=right data-sort-value="0.84" | 840 m || 
|-id=077 bgcolor=#FA8072
| 514077 ||  || — || November 7, 2007 || Mount Lemmon || Mount Lemmon Survey || H || align=right data-sort-value="0.90" | 900 m || 
|-id=078 bgcolor=#C2FFFF
| 514078 ||  || — || May 16, 2009 || Mount Lemmon || Mount Lemmon Survey || L5 || align=right | 8.7 km || 
|-id=079 bgcolor=#C2FFFF
| 514079 ||  || — || March 11, 2005 || Mount Lemmon || Mount Lemmon Survey || L5 || align=right | 9.5 km || 
|-id=080 bgcolor=#fefefe
| 514080 ||  || — || September 27, 2011 || Mount Lemmon || Mount Lemmon Survey || H || align=right data-sort-value="0.63" | 630 m || 
|-id=081 bgcolor=#fefefe
| 514081 ||  || — || March 31, 2008 || Catalina || CSS || H || align=right data-sort-value="0.65" | 650 m || 
|-id=082 bgcolor=#C2FFFF
| 514082 ||  || — || September 13, 2012 || Mount Lemmon || Mount Lemmon Survey || L5 || align=right | 7.8 km || 
|-id=083 bgcolor=#C2FFFF
| 514083 ||  || — || July 25, 2011 || Haleakala || Pan-STARRS || L5 || align=right | 8.6 km || 
|-id=084 bgcolor=#C2FFFF
| 514084 ||  || — || March 11, 2008 || Mount Lemmon || Mount Lemmon Survey || L5 || align=right | 7.7 km || 
|-id=085 bgcolor=#FA8072
| 514085 ||  || — || October 3, 2014 || Haleakala || Pan-STARRS || H || align=right data-sort-value="0.68" | 680 m || 
|-id=086 bgcolor=#fefefe
| 514086 ||  || — || August 3, 2011 || Haleakala || Pan-STARRS || H || align=right data-sort-value="0.68" | 680 m || 
|-id=087 bgcolor=#fefefe
| 514087 ||  || — || September 20, 2014 || Haleakala || Pan-STARRS || H || align=right data-sort-value="0.61" | 610 m || 
|-id=088 bgcolor=#fefefe
| 514088 ||  || — || August 28, 2011 || Haleakala || Pan-STARRS || H || align=right data-sort-value="0.52" | 520 m || 
|-id=089 bgcolor=#C2FFFF
| 514089 ||  || — || May 4, 2009 || Mount Lemmon || Mount Lemmon Survey || L5 || align=right | 8.9 km || 
|-id=090 bgcolor=#d6d6d6
| 514090 ||  || — || November 7, 2007 || Mount Lemmon || Mount Lemmon Survey ||  || align=right | 3.9 km || 
|-id=091 bgcolor=#FA8072
| 514091 ||  || — || November 20, 2014 || Haleakala || Pan-STARRS || H || align=right data-sort-value="0.57" | 570 m || 
|-id=092 bgcolor=#fefefe
| 514092 ||  || — || August 28, 2006 || Catalina || CSS || H || align=right data-sort-value="0.47" | 470 m || 
|-id=093 bgcolor=#fefefe
| 514093 ||  || — || May 7, 2005 || Mount Lemmon || Mount Lemmon Survey ||  || align=right | 1.0 km || 
|-id=094 bgcolor=#fefefe
| 514094 ||  || — || November 16, 2014 || Mount Lemmon || Mount Lemmon Survey || H || align=right data-sort-value="0.72" | 720 m || 
|-id=095 bgcolor=#C2FFFF
| 514095 ||  || — || April 7, 2008 || Mount Lemmon || Mount Lemmon Survey || L5 || align=right | 11 km || 
|-id=096 bgcolor=#fefefe
| 514096 ||  || — || September 23, 2008 || Kitt Peak || Spacewatch || H || align=right data-sort-value="0.62" | 620 m || 
|-id=097 bgcolor=#C2FFFF
| 514097 ||  || — || June 26, 2011 || Mount Lemmon || Mount Lemmon Survey || L5 || align=right | 8.3 km || 
|-id=098 bgcolor=#C2FFFF
| 514098 ||  || — || April 10, 2008 || Kitt Peak || Spacewatch || L5 || align=right | 10 km || 
|-id=099 bgcolor=#C2FFFF
| 514099 ||  || — || April 15, 2008 || Mount Lemmon || Mount Lemmon Survey || L5 || align=right | 7.5 km || 
|-id=100 bgcolor=#E9E9E9
| 514100 ||  || — || February 27, 2006 || Catalina || CSS ||  || align=right | 2.9 km || 
|}

514101–514200 

|-bgcolor=#fefefe
| 514101 ||  || — || August 2, 2005 || Siding Spring || SSS || H || align=right data-sort-value="0.88" | 880 m || 
|-id=102 bgcolor=#FA8072
| 514102 ||  || — || October 9, 2008 || Catalina || CSS ||  || align=right data-sort-value="0.68" | 680 m || 
|-id=103 bgcolor=#fefefe
| 514103 ||  || — || January 11, 2015 || Haleakala || Pan-STARRS || H || align=right data-sort-value="0.54" | 540 m || 
|-id=104 bgcolor=#fefefe
| 514104 ||  || — || February 17, 2007 || Kitt Peak || Spacewatch || H || align=right data-sort-value="0.67" | 670 m || 
|-id=105 bgcolor=#FA8072
| 514105 ||  || — || September 13, 2007 || Catalina || CSS ||  || align=right data-sort-value="0.42" | 420 m || 
|-id=106 bgcolor=#fefefe
| 514106 ||  || — || October 17, 2003 || Kitt Peak || Spacewatch ||  || align=right data-sort-value="0.75" | 750 m || 
|-id=107 bgcolor=#B88A00
| 514107 Kaʻepaokaʻawela ||  ||  || November 26, 2014 || Haleakala || Pan-STARRS || damocloidunusual || align=right | 3.5 km || 
|-id=108 bgcolor=#d6d6d6
| 514108 ||  || — || April 7, 2010 || Kitt Peak || Spacewatch ||  || align=right | 2.8 km || 
|-id=109 bgcolor=#fefefe
| 514109 ||  || — || March 16, 2005 || Catalina || CSS || H || align=right data-sort-value="0.78" | 780 m || 
|-id=110 bgcolor=#fefefe
| 514110 ||  || — || January 23, 2015 || Haleakala || Pan-STARRS ||  || align=right data-sort-value="0.46" | 460 m || 
|-id=111 bgcolor=#fefefe
| 514111 ||  || — || August 19, 2009 || La Sagra || OAM Obs. ||  || align=right data-sort-value="0.72" | 720 m || 
|-id=112 bgcolor=#fefefe
| 514112 ||  || — || March 10, 2005 || Mount Lemmon || Mount Lemmon Survey ||  || align=right data-sort-value="0.75" | 750 m || 
|-id=113 bgcolor=#fefefe
| 514113 ||  || — || January 14, 2008 || Kitt Peak || Spacewatch ||  || align=right data-sort-value="0.68" | 680 m || 
|-id=114 bgcolor=#fefefe
| 514114 ||  || — || January 25, 2015 || Haleakala || Pan-STARRS ||  || align=right data-sort-value="0.77" | 770 m || 
|-id=115 bgcolor=#fefefe
| 514115 ||  || — || April 30, 2008 || Mount Lemmon || Mount Lemmon Survey ||  || align=right data-sort-value="0.68" | 680 m || 
|-id=116 bgcolor=#E9E9E9
| 514116 ||  || — || March 11, 2011 || Mount Lemmon || Mount Lemmon Survey ||  || align=right | 1.2 km || 
|-id=117 bgcolor=#fefefe
| 514117 ||  || — || October 17, 2010 || Mount Lemmon || Mount Lemmon Survey ||  || align=right data-sort-value="0.56" | 560 m || 
|-id=118 bgcolor=#fefefe
| 514118 ||  || — || March 28, 2012 || Mount Lemmon || Mount Lemmon Survey ||  || align=right data-sort-value="0.66" | 660 m || 
|-id=119 bgcolor=#fefefe
| 514119 ||  || — || March 3, 2008 || Mount Lemmon || Mount Lemmon Survey ||  || align=right data-sort-value="0.59" | 590 m || 
|-id=120 bgcolor=#fefefe
| 514120 ||  || — || November 26, 2009 || Mount Lemmon || Mount Lemmon Survey ||  || align=right data-sort-value="0.78" | 780 m || 
|-id=121 bgcolor=#fefefe
| 514121 ||  || — || March 12, 2008 || Kitt Peak || Spacewatch ||  || align=right data-sort-value="0.85" | 850 m || 
|-id=122 bgcolor=#fefefe
| 514122 ||  || — || September 13, 2012 || Siding Spring || SSS ||  || align=right | 1.2 km || 
|-id=123 bgcolor=#E9E9E9
| 514123 ||  || — || September 14, 2007 || Catalina || CSS ||  || align=right | 1.3 km || 
|-id=124 bgcolor=#fefefe
| 514124 ||  || — || September 17, 2009 || Kitt Peak || Spacewatch ||  || align=right | 1.0 km || 
|-id=125 bgcolor=#fefefe
| 514125 ||  || — || April 6, 2011 || Mount Lemmon || Mount Lemmon Survey ||  || align=right data-sort-value="0.82" | 820 m || 
|-id=126 bgcolor=#E9E9E9
| 514126 ||  || — || October 20, 2012 || Haleakala || Pan-STARRS ||  || align=right data-sort-value="0.94" | 940 m || 
|-id=127 bgcolor=#fefefe
| 514127 ||  || — || April 12, 2002 || Socorro || LINEAR ||  || align=right data-sort-value="0.59" | 590 m || 
|-id=128 bgcolor=#fefefe
| 514128 ||  || — || September 21, 2009 || Mount Lemmon || Mount Lemmon Survey ||  || align=right data-sort-value="0.90" | 900 m || 
|-id=129 bgcolor=#fefefe
| 514129 ||  || — || May 4, 2005 || Mount Lemmon || Mount Lemmon Survey ||  || align=right data-sort-value="0.59" | 590 m || 
|-id=130 bgcolor=#fefefe
| 514130 ||  || — || May 21, 2012 || Haleakala || Pan-STARRS ||  || align=right data-sort-value="0.64" | 640 m || 
|-id=131 bgcolor=#fefefe
| 514131 ||  || — || January 26, 2015 || Haleakala || Pan-STARRS ||  || align=right data-sort-value="0.63" | 630 m || 
|-id=132 bgcolor=#E9E9E9
| 514132 ||  || — || April 30, 2011 || Haleakala || Pan-STARRS || EUN || align=right | 1.3 km || 
|-id=133 bgcolor=#fefefe
| 514133 ||  || — || November 26, 2013 || Haleakala || Pan-STARRS ||  || align=right data-sort-value="0.66" | 660 m || 
|-id=134 bgcolor=#fefefe
| 514134 ||  || — || November 8, 2013 || Mount Lemmon || Mount Lemmon Survey ||  || align=right data-sort-value="0.66" | 660 m || 
|-id=135 bgcolor=#fefefe
| 514135 ||  || — || July 26, 2008 || La Sagra || OAM Obs. || NYS || align=right data-sort-value="0.69" | 690 m || 
|-id=136 bgcolor=#fefefe
| 514136 ||  || — || April 23, 2015 || Haleakala || Pan-STARRS ||  || align=right data-sort-value="0.75" | 750 m || 
|-id=137 bgcolor=#fefefe
| 514137 ||  || — || April 23, 2015 || Haleakala || Pan-STARRS || V || align=right data-sort-value="0.42" | 420 m || 
|-id=138 bgcolor=#fefefe
| 514138 ||  || — || September 27, 2006 || Kitt Peak || Spacewatch ||  || align=right data-sort-value="0.68" | 680 m || 
|-id=139 bgcolor=#fefefe
| 514139 ||  || — || December 3, 2007 || Kitt Peak || Spacewatch ||  || align=right data-sort-value="0.61" | 610 m || 
|-id=140 bgcolor=#fefefe
| 514140 ||  || — || March 27, 2004 || Kitt Peak || Spacewatch ||  || align=right data-sort-value="0.70" | 700 m || 
|-id=141 bgcolor=#fefefe
| 514141 ||  || — || January 27, 2007 || Mount Lemmon || Mount Lemmon Survey ||  || align=right data-sort-value="0.75" | 750 m || 
|-id=142 bgcolor=#E9E9E9
| 514142 ||  || — || February 26, 2014 || Haleakala || Pan-STARRS ||  || align=right | 1.2 km || 
|-id=143 bgcolor=#fefefe
| 514143 ||  || — || March 19, 2004 || Socorro || LINEAR ||  || align=right data-sort-value="0.74" | 740 m || 
|-id=144 bgcolor=#fefefe
| 514144 ||  || — || March 13, 2011 || Kitt Peak || Spacewatch ||  || align=right data-sort-value="0.75" | 750 m || 
|-id=145 bgcolor=#fefefe
| 514145 ||  || — || May 4, 2005 || Mount Lemmon || Mount Lemmon Survey ||  || align=right data-sort-value="0.58" | 580 m || 
|-id=146 bgcolor=#fefefe
| 514146 ||  || — || March 6, 2011 || Mount Lemmon || Mount Lemmon Survey ||  || align=right data-sort-value="0.60" | 600 m || 
|-id=147 bgcolor=#fefefe
| 514147 ||  || — || October 16, 2009 || Mount Lemmon || Mount Lemmon Survey ||  || align=right data-sort-value="0.71" | 710 m || 
|-id=148 bgcolor=#fefefe
| 514148 ||  || — || November 9, 2009 || Kitt Peak || Spacewatch ||  || align=right data-sort-value="0.90" | 900 m || 
|-id=149 bgcolor=#fefefe
| 514149 ||  || — || November 5, 1999 || Kitt Peak || Spacewatch ||  || align=right data-sort-value="0.82" | 820 m || 
|-id=150 bgcolor=#FFC2E0
| 514150 ||  || — || May 18, 2015 || Haleakala || Pan-STARRS || APOPHAcritical || align=right data-sort-value="0.19" | 190 m || 
|-id=151 bgcolor=#fefefe
| 514151 ||  || — || April 23, 2015 || Haleakala || Pan-STARRS ||  || align=right data-sort-value="0.79" | 790 m || 
|-id=152 bgcolor=#fefefe
| 514152 ||  || — || March 23, 2004 || Kitt Peak || Spacewatch ||  || align=right data-sort-value="0.62" | 620 m || 
|-id=153 bgcolor=#fefefe
| 514153 ||  || — || March 5, 2011 || Mount Lemmon || Mount Lemmon Survey ||  || align=right data-sort-value="0.82" | 820 m || 
|-id=154 bgcolor=#fefefe
| 514154 ||  || — || March 22, 2015 || Mount Lemmon || Mount Lemmon Survey ||  || align=right data-sort-value="0.91" | 910 m || 
|-id=155 bgcolor=#fefefe
| 514155 ||  || — || January 30, 2011 || Haleakala || Pan-STARRS ||  || align=right data-sort-value="0.57" | 570 m || 
|-id=156 bgcolor=#fefefe
| 514156 ||  || — || February 4, 2011 || Haleakala || Pan-STARRS || NYS || align=right data-sort-value="0.55" | 550 m || 
|-id=157 bgcolor=#E9E9E9
| 514157 ||  || — || March 1, 2009 || Mount Lemmon || Mount Lemmon Survey ||  || align=right | 2.0 km || 
|-id=158 bgcolor=#E9E9E9
| 514158 ||  || — || May 21, 2015 || Haleakala || Pan-STARRS ||  || align=right data-sort-value="0.87" | 870 m || 
|-id=159 bgcolor=#fefefe
| 514159 ||  || — || April 8, 2008 || Kitt Peak || Spacewatch ||  || align=right data-sort-value="0.84" | 840 m || 
|-id=160 bgcolor=#E9E9E9
| 514160 ||  || — || November 6, 2012 || Kitt Peak || Spacewatch ||  || align=right | 1.9 km || 
|-id=161 bgcolor=#E9E9E9
| 514161 ||  || — || February 26, 2014 || Haleakala || Pan-STARRS ||  || align=right | 2.0 km || 
|-id=162 bgcolor=#fefefe
| 514162 ||  || — || January 30, 2011 || Haleakala || Pan-STARRS ||  || align=right data-sort-value="0.68" | 680 m || 
|-id=163 bgcolor=#fefefe
| 514163 ||  || — || March 21, 2015 || Haleakala || Pan-STARRS ||  || align=right data-sort-value="0.69" | 690 m || 
|-id=164 bgcolor=#E9E9E9
| 514164 ||  || — || February 20, 2009 || Kitt Peak || Spacewatch ||  || align=right | 1.8 km || 
|-id=165 bgcolor=#E9E9E9
| 514165 ||  || — || October 7, 2007 || Mount Lemmon || Mount Lemmon Survey ||  || align=right | 2.0 km || 
|-id=166 bgcolor=#fefefe
| 514166 ||  || — || April 15, 2011 || Haleakala || Pan-STARRS ||  || align=right data-sort-value="0.78" | 780 m || 
|-id=167 bgcolor=#fefefe
| 514167 ||  || — || February 10, 1999 || Kitt Peak || Spacewatch ||  || align=right data-sort-value="0.71" | 710 m || 
|-id=168 bgcolor=#E9E9E9
| 514168 ||  || — || October 17, 2007 || Mount Lemmon || Mount Lemmon Survey ||  || align=right | 1.7 km || 
|-id=169 bgcolor=#E9E9E9
| 514169 ||  || — || October 20, 2007 || Mount Lemmon || Mount Lemmon Survey ||  || align=right | 2.3 km || 
|-id=170 bgcolor=#fefefe
| 514170 ||  || — || May 30, 2012 || Mount Lemmon || Mount Lemmon Survey ||  || align=right data-sort-value="0.76" | 760 m || 
|-id=171 bgcolor=#fefefe
| 514171 ||  || — || February 14, 2005 || Kitt Peak || Spacewatch ||  || align=right data-sort-value="0.57" | 570 m || 
|-id=172 bgcolor=#fefefe
| 514172 ||  || — || March 27, 2008 || Mount Lemmon || Mount Lemmon Survey ||  || align=right data-sort-value="0.52" | 520 m || 
|-id=173 bgcolor=#E9E9E9
| 514173 ||  || — || October 8, 2012 || Haleakala || Pan-STARRS ||  || align=right data-sort-value="0.72" | 720 m || 
|-id=174 bgcolor=#E9E9E9
| 514174 ||  || — || March 7, 2014 || Kitt Peak || Spacewatch ||  || align=right | 2.1 km || 
|-id=175 bgcolor=#fefefe
| 514175 ||  || — || October 28, 2008 || Mount Lemmon || Mount Lemmon Survey ||  || align=right data-sort-value="0.82" | 820 m || 
|-id=176 bgcolor=#E9E9E9
| 514176 ||  || — || April 12, 2010 || Mount Lemmon || Mount Lemmon Survey ||  || align=right data-sort-value="0.97" | 970 m || 
|-id=177 bgcolor=#fefefe
| 514177 ||  || — || September 9, 2008 || Mount Lemmon || Mount Lemmon Survey ||  || align=right data-sort-value="0.86" | 860 m || 
|-id=178 bgcolor=#fefefe
| 514178 ||  || — || March 26, 2011 || Mount Lemmon || Mount Lemmon Survey ||  || align=right data-sort-value="0.65" | 650 m || 
|-id=179 bgcolor=#fefefe
| 514179 ||  || — || October 17, 2012 || Mount Lemmon || Mount Lemmon Survey ||  || align=right data-sort-value="0.94" | 940 m || 
|-id=180 bgcolor=#fefefe
| 514180 ||  || — || October 31, 2005 || Kitt Peak || Spacewatch ||  || align=right data-sort-value="0.76" | 760 m || 
|-id=181 bgcolor=#fefefe
| 514181 ||  || — || March 13, 2011 || Kitt Peak || Spacewatch ||  || align=right data-sort-value="0.78" | 780 m || 
|-id=182 bgcolor=#fefefe
| 514182 ||  || — || January 7, 2014 || Kitt Peak || Spacewatch ||  || align=right data-sort-value="0.86" | 860 m || 
|-id=183 bgcolor=#d6d6d6
| 514183 ||  || — || June 18, 2015 || Haleakala || Pan-STARRS ||  || align=right | 2.5 km || 
|-id=184 bgcolor=#E9E9E9
| 514184 ||  || — || January 1, 2009 || Kitt Peak || Spacewatch ||  || align=right | 2.0 km || 
|-id=185 bgcolor=#E9E9E9
| 514185 ||  || — || December 4, 2007 || Mount Lemmon || Mount Lemmon Survey ||  || align=right | 1.8 km || 
|-id=186 bgcolor=#E9E9E9
| 514186 ||  || — || October 20, 2007 || Mount Lemmon || Mount Lemmon Survey ||  || align=right | 1.3 km || 
|-id=187 bgcolor=#E9E9E9
| 514187 ||  || — || July 28, 2011 || Haleakala || Pan-STARRS ||  || align=right data-sort-value="0.90" | 900 m || 
|-id=188 bgcolor=#d6d6d6
| 514188 ||  || — || January 10, 2007 || Mount Lemmon || Mount Lemmon Survey ||  || align=right | 2.2 km || 
|-id=189 bgcolor=#d6d6d6
| 514189 ||  || — || December 23, 2012 || Haleakala || Pan-STARRS ||  || align=right | 2.0 km || 
|-id=190 bgcolor=#E9E9E9
| 514190 ||  || — || January 18, 2009 || Kitt Peak || Spacewatch ||  || align=right | 1.7 km || 
|-id=191 bgcolor=#E9E9E9
| 514191 ||  || — || September 23, 2011 || Haleakala || Pan-STARRS ||  || align=right | 1.7 km || 
|-id=192 bgcolor=#fefefe
| 514192 ||  || — || May 23, 2011 || Mount Lemmon || Mount Lemmon Survey ||  || align=right data-sort-value="0.91" | 910 m || 
|-id=193 bgcolor=#fefefe
| 514193 ||  || — || January 25, 2006 || Kitt Peak || Spacewatch ||  || align=right data-sort-value="0.95" | 950 m || 
|-id=194 bgcolor=#E9E9E9
| 514194 ||  || — || October 19, 2011 || Haleakala || Pan-STARRS ||  || align=right | 2.3 km || 
|-id=195 bgcolor=#fefefe
| 514195 ||  || — || April 6, 1999 || Kitt Peak || Spacewatch || MAS || align=right data-sort-value="0.82" | 820 m || 
|-id=196 bgcolor=#E9E9E9
| 514196 ||  || — || February 27, 2014 || Kitt Peak || Spacewatch ||  || align=right | 1.4 km || 
|-id=197 bgcolor=#fefefe
| 514197 ||  || — || May 11, 2007 || Mount Lemmon || Mount Lemmon Survey || MAS || align=right data-sort-value="0.86" | 860 m || 
|-id=198 bgcolor=#d6d6d6
| 514198 ||  || — || April 4, 2014 || Haleakala || Pan-STARRS ||  || align=right | 2.1 km || 
|-id=199 bgcolor=#fefefe
| 514199 ||  || — || March 9, 2007 || Catalina || CSS ||  || align=right data-sort-value="0.82" | 820 m || 
|-id=200 bgcolor=#E9E9E9
| 514200 ||  || — || February 16, 2010 || Mount Lemmon || Mount Lemmon Survey ||  || align=right data-sort-value="0.71" | 710 m || 
|}

514201–514300 

|-bgcolor=#d6d6d6
| 514201 ||  || — || May 21, 2014 || Haleakala || Pan-STARRS ||  || align=right | 2.4 km || 
|-id=202 bgcolor=#d6d6d6
| 514202 ||  || — || November 17, 2011 || Kitt Peak || Spacewatch ||  || align=right | 2.4 km || 
|-id=203 bgcolor=#E9E9E9
| 514203 ||  || — || February 1, 2009 || Kitt Peak || Spacewatch ||  || align=right | 1.9 km || 
|-id=204 bgcolor=#E9E9E9
| 514204 ||  || — || September 12, 2007 || Mount Lemmon || Mount Lemmon Survey ||  || align=right | 1.4 km || 
|-id=205 bgcolor=#E9E9E9
| 514205 ||  || — || November 18, 2007 || Mount Lemmon || Mount Lemmon Survey ||  || align=right | 2.0 km || 
|-id=206 bgcolor=#E9E9E9
| 514206 ||  || — || December 30, 2008 || Mount Lemmon || Mount Lemmon Survey ||  || align=right | 1.4 km || 
|-id=207 bgcolor=#d6d6d6
| 514207 ||  || — || April 5, 2014 || Haleakala || Pan-STARRS ||  || align=right | 3.3 km || 
|-id=208 bgcolor=#E9E9E9
| 514208 ||  || — || March 23, 2014 || Kitt Peak || Spacewatch ||  || align=right | 1.7 km || 
|-id=209 bgcolor=#d6d6d6
| 514209 ||  || — || September 3, 2010 || Mount Lemmon || Mount Lemmon Survey ||  || align=right | 2.5 km || 
|-id=210 bgcolor=#E9E9E9
| 514210 ||  || — || February 26, 2014 || Haleakala || Pan-STARRS ||  || align=right | 1.8 km || 
|-id=211 bgcolor=#E9E9E9
| 514211 ||  || — || January 2, 2009 || Mount Lemmon || Mount Lemmon Survey ||  || align=right | 2.9 km || 
|-id=212 bgcolor=#E9E9E9
| 514212 ||  || — || July 16, 2010 || WISE || WISE ||  || align=right | 2.2 km || 
|-id=213 bgcolor=#d6d6d6
| 514213 ||  || — || September 26, 2006 || Mount Lemmon || Mount Lemmon Survey ||  || align=right | 2.3 km || 
|-id=214 bgcolor=#E9E9E9
| 514214 ||  || — || February 11, 2014 || Mount Lemmon || Mount Lemmon Survey ||  || align=right | 1.1 km || 
|-id=215 bgcolor=#d6d6d6
| 514215 ||  || — || November 26, 2011 || Kitt Peak || Spacewatch ||  || align=right | 2.9 km || 
|-id=216 bgcolor=#E9E9E9
| 514216 ||  || — || April 25, 2010 || Kitt Peak || Spacewatch ||  || align=right | 1.3 km || 
|-id=217 bgcolor=#d6d6d6
| 514217 ||  || — || April 5, 2014 || Haleakala || Pan-STARRS ||  || align=right | 2.0 km || 
|-id=218 bgcolor=#E9E9E9
| 514218 ||  || — || April 9, 2010 || Kitt Peak || Spacewatch ||  || align=right | 1.6 km || 
|-id=219 bgcolor=#d6d6d6
| 514219 ||  || — || January 18, 2012 || Mount Lemmon || Mount Lemmon Survey ||  || align=right | 2.6 km || 
|-id=220 bgcolor=#d6d6d6
| 514220 ||  || — || June 20, 2015 || Haleakala || Pan-STARRS ||  || align=right | 2.1 km || 
|-id=221 bgcolor=#fefefe
| 514221 ||  || — || February 26, 2014 || Haleakala || Pan-STARRS ||  || align=right | 1.1 km || 
|-id=222 bgcolor=#E9E9E9
| 514222 ||  || — || August 23, 2011 || Haleakala || Pan-STARRS ||  || align=right | 1.6 km || 
|-id=223 bgcolor=#d6d6d6
| 514223 ||  || — || October 19, 2000 || Kitt Peak || Spacewatch ||  || align=right | 3.0 km || 
|-id=224 bgcolor=#E9E9E9
| 514224 ||  || — || September 25, 2011 || Haleakala || Pan-STARRS ||  || align=right | 1.7 km || 
|-id=225 bgcolor=#E9E9E9
| 514225 ||  || — || August 24, 2011 || Haleakala || Pan-STARRS ||  || align=right | 1.00 km || 
|-id=226 bgcolor=#E9E9E9
| 514226 ||  || — || February 15, 2010 || Kitt Peak || Spacewatch ||  || align=right | 1.00 km || 
|-id=227 bgcolor=#E9E9E9
| 514227 ||  || — || April 21, 2006 || Catalina || CSS ||  || align=right | 1.7 km || 
|-id=228 bgcolor=#d6d6d6
| 514228 ||  || — || January 11, 2008 || Kitt Peak || Spacewatch ||  || align=right | 1.9 km || 
|-id=229 bgcolor=#E9E9E9
| 514229 ||  || — || December 5, 2007 || Mount Lemmon || Mount Lemmon Survey ||  || align=right | 1.9 km || 
|-id=230 bgcolor=#d6d6d6
| 514230 ||  || — || February 17, 2013 || Kitt Peak || Spacewatch ||  || align=right | 2.3 km || 
|-id=231 bgcolor=#E9E9E9
| 514231 ||  || — || January 14, 2013 || Mount Lemmon || Mount Lemmon Survey ||  || align=right | 2.4 km || 
|-id=232 bgcolor=#d6d6d6
| 514232 ||  || — || March 14, 2013 || Kitt Peak || Spacewatch ||  || align=right | 2.8 km || 
|-id=233 bgcolor=#E9E9E9
| 514233 ||  || — || January 10, 2014 || Mount Lemmon || Mount Lemmon Survey ||  || align=right | 2.9 km || 
|-id=234 bgcolor=#E9E9E9
| 514234 ||  || — || September 18, 2011 || Mount Lemmon || Mount Lemmon Survey ||  || align=right data-sort-value="0.90" | 900 m || 
|-id=235 bgcolor=#d6d6d6
| 514235 ||  || — || September 11, 2004 || Kitt Peak || Spacewatch ||  || align=right | 2.7 km || 
|-id=236 bgcolor=#d6d6d6
| 514236 ||  || — || February 27, 2008 || Mount Lemmon || Mount Lemmon Survey ||  || align=right | 2.4 km || 
|-id=237 bgcolor=#d6d6d6
| 514237 ||  || — || October 25, 2011 || Haleakala || Pan-STARRS ||  || align=right | 1.9 km || 
|-id=238 bgcolor=#d6d6d6
| 514238 ||  || — || February 21, 2007 || Mount Lemmon || Mount Lemmon Survey ||  || align=right | 3.1 km || 
|-id=239 bgcolor=#E9E9E9
| 514239 ||  || — || January 10, 2013 || Haleakala || Pan-STARRS ||  || align=right | 1.6 km || 
|-id=240 bgcolor=#d6d6d6
| 514240 ||  || — || May 5, 2008 || Kitt Peak || Spacewatch ||  || align=right | 3.5 km || 
|-id=241 bgcolor=#E9E9E9
| 514241 ||  || — || April 6, 2010 || Mount Lemmon || Mount Lemmon Survey ||  || align=right | 1.3 km || 
|-id=242 bgcolor=#E9E9E9
| 514242 ||  || — || December 22, 2008 || Kitt Peak || Spacewatch ||  || align=right | 1.2 km || 
|-id=243 bgcolor=#d6d6d6
| 514243 ||  || — || May 7, 2014 || Haleakala || Pan-STARRS ||  || align=right | 2.9 km || 
|-id=244 bgcolor=#E9E9E9
| 514244 ||  || — || September 18, 2003 || Kitt Peak || Spacewatch ||  || align=right | 1.0 km || 
|-id=245 bgcolor=#E9E9E9
| 514245 ||  || — || February 1, 2005 || Kitt Peak || Spacewatch ||  || align=right | 1.4 km || 
|-id=246 bgcolor=#d6d6d6
| 514246 ||  || — || October 31, 2010 || Mount Lemmon || Mount Lemmon Survey ||  || align=right | 2.5 km || 
|-id=247 bgcolor=#E9E9E9
| 514247 ||  || — || September 14, 2007 || Catalina || CSS ||  || align=right | 1.3 km || 
|-id=248 bgcolor=#d6d6d6
| 514248 ||  || — || May 29, 2010 || WISE || WISE ||  || align=right | 2.3 km || 
|-id=249 bgcolor=#E9E9E9
| 514249 ||  || — || August 25, 2011 || La Sagra || OAM Obs. ||  || align=right | 1.1 km || 
|-id=250 bgcolor=#E9E9E9
| 514250 ||  || — || September 26, 2011 || Haleakala || Pan-STARRS ||  || align=right | 1.5 km || 
|-id=251 bgcolor=#d6d6d6
| 514251 ||  || — || July 27, 2015 || Haleakala || Pan-STARRS ||  || align=right | 2.2 km || 
|-id=252 bgcolor=#E9E9E9
| 514252 ||  || — || March 4, 2005 || Mount Lemmon || Mount Lemmon Survey ||  || align=right | 1.6 km || 
|-id=253 bgcolor=#d6d6d6
| 514253 ||  || — || June 30, 2015 || Haleakala || Pan-STARRS || EOS || align=right | 1.7 km || 
|-id=254 bgcolor=#E9E9E9
| 514254 ||  || — || March 11, 2005 || Mount Lemmon || Mount Lemmon Survey ||  || align=right | 2.1 km || 
|-id=255 bgcolor=#fefefe
| 514255 ||  || — || May 24, 2011 || Haleakala || Pan-STARRS ||  || align=right data-sort-value="0.94" | 940 m || 
|-id=256 bgcolor=#d6d6d6
| 514256 ||  || — || October 29, 2010 || Mount Lemmon || Mount Lemmon Survey ||  || align=right | 3.5 km || 
|-id=257 bgcolor=#d6d6d6
| 514257 ||  || — || May 4, 2014 || Mount Lemmon || Mount Lemmon Survey ||  || align=right | 2.5 km || 
|-id=258 bgcolor=#E9E9E9
| 514258 ||  || — || September 4, 2011 || Haleakala || Pan-STARRS ||  || align=right | 1.3 km || 
|-id=259 bgcolor=#E9E9E9
| 514259 ||  || — || February 9, 2013 || Haleakala || Pan-STARRS ||  || align=right | 2.1 km || 
|-id=260 bgcolor=#d6d6d6
| 514260 ||  || — || April 14, 2010 || WISE || WISE ||  || align=right | 1.8 km || 
|-id=261 bgcolor=#d6d6d6
| 514261 ||  || — || May 7, 2014 || Haleakala || Pan-STARRS ||  || align=right | 1.9 km || 
|-id=262 bgcolor=#d6d6d6
| 514262 ||  || — || February 28, 2008 || Mount Lemmon || Mount Lemmon Survey ||  || align=right | 3.2 km || 
|-id=263 bgcolor=#d6d6d6
| 514263 ||  || — || September 2, 2010 || Mount Lemmon || Mount Lemmon Survey ||  || align=right | 2.4 km || 
|-id=264 bgcolor=#d6d6d6
| 514264 ||  || — || September 8, 2004 || Socorro || LINEAR ||  || align=right | 3.2 km || 
|-id=265 bgcolor=#d6d6d6
| 514265 ||  || — || August 25, 2004 || Kitt Peak || Spacewatch ||  || align=right | 3.2 km || 
|-id=266 bgcolor=#d6d6d6
| 514266 ||  || — || April 13, 2008 || Kitt Peak || Spacewatch ||  || align=right | 2.6 km || 
|-id=267 bgcolor=#d6d6d6
| 514267 ||  || — || April 8, 2013 || Mount Lemmon || Mount Lemmon Survey ||  || align=right | 2.5 km || 
|-id=268 bgcolor=#d6d6d6
| 514268 ||  || — || October 17, 2010 || Mount Lemmon || Mount Lemmon Survey ||  || align=right | 2.8 km || 
|-id=269 bgcolor=#d6d6d6
| 514269 ||  || — || March 8, 2013 || Haleakala || Pan-STARRS ||  || align=right | 3.6 km || 
|-id=270 bgcolor=#d6d6d6
| 514270 ||  || — || October 9, 2004 || Anderson Mesa || LONEOS ||  || align=right | 3.4 km || 
|-id=271 bgcolor=#d6d6d6
| 514271 ||  || — || November 25, 2005 || Mount Lemmon || Mount Lemmon Survey ||  || align=right | 4.0 km || 
|-id=272 bgcolor=#d6d6d6
| 514272 ||  || — || November 9, 2004 || Catalina || CSS ||  || align=right | 4.9 km || 
|-id=273 bgcolor=#d6d6d6
| 514273 ||  || — || October 30, 2010 || Mount Lemmon || Mount Lemmon Survey ||  || align=right | 2.6 km || 
|-id=274 bgcolor=#E9E9E9
| 514274 ||  || — || October 17, 2007 || Mount Lemmon || Mount Lemmon Survey ||  || align=right | 1.2 km || 
|-id=275 bgcolor=#E9E9E9
| 514275 ||  || — || February 28, 2014 || Haleakala || Pan-STARRS ||  || align=right | 2.1 km || 
|-id=276 bgcolor=#d6d6d6
| 514276 ||  || — || August 19, 2009 || La Sagra || OAM Obs. ||  || align=right | 3.3 km || 
|-id=277 bgcolor=#d6d6d6
| 514277 ||  || — || September 18, 2010 || Mount Lemmon || Mount Lemmon Survey ||  || align=right | 3.5 km || 
|-id=278 bgcolor=#d6d6d6
| 514278 ||  || — || December 2, 2005 || Mount Lemmon || Mount Lemmon Survey ||  || align=right | 3.8 km || 
|-id=279 bgcolor=#d6d6d6
| 514279 ||  || — || January 26, 2012 || Mount Lemmon || Mount Lemmon Survey ||  || align=right | 3.1 km || 
|-id=280 bgcolor=#d6d6d6
| 514280 ||  || — || March 8, 2013 || Haleakala || Pan-STARRS ||  || align=right | 2.8 km || 
|-id=281 bgcolor=#d6d6d6
| 514281 ||  || — || March 19, 2013 || Haleakala || Pan-STARRS ||  || align=right | 3.1 km || 
|-id=282 bgcolor=#d6d6d6
| 514282 ||  || — || October 30, 2010 || Mount Lemmon || Mount Lemmon Survey ||  || align=right | 3.2 km || 
|-id=283 bgcolor=#E9E9E9
| 514283 ||  || — || August 19, 2006 || Kitt Peak || Spacewatch ||  || align=right | 2.3 km || 
|-id=284 bgcolor=#d6d6d6
| 514284 ||  || — || July 27, 2010 || WISE || WISE ||  || align=right | 2.5 km || 
|-id=285 bgcolor=#d6d6d6
| 514285 ||  || — || January 30, 2006 || Kitt Peak || Spacewatch ||  || align=right | 2.7 km || 
|-id=286 bgcolor=#d6d6d6
| 514286 ||  || — || March 11, 2008 || Mount Lemmon || Mount Lemmon Survey ||  || align=right | 3.1 km || 
|-id=287 bgcolor=#d6d6d6
| 514287 ||  || — || December 5, 2005 || Kitt Peak || Spacewatch ||  || align=right | 3.0 km || 
|-id=288 bgcolor=#d6d6d6
| 514288 ||  || — || March 10, 2007 || Mount Lemmon || Mount Lemmon Survey ||  || align=right | 3.0 km || 
|-id=289 bgcolor=#d6d6d6
| 514289 ||  || — || September 14, 2007 || Mount Lemmon || Mount Lemmon Survey || 3:2 || align=right | 3.7 km || 
|-id=290 bgcolor=#E9E9E9
| 514290 ||  || — || August 28, 2006 || Kitt Peak || Spacewatch ||  || align=right | 2.3 km || 
|-id=291 bgcolor=#E9E9E9
| 514291 ||  || — || November 25, 2011 || Haleakala || Pan-STARRS ||  || align=right | 2.4 km || 
|-id=292 bgcolor=#d6d6d6
| 514292 ||  || — || October 30, 2010 || Kitt Peak || Spacewatch ||  || align=right | 3.3 km || 
|-id=293 bgcolor=#d6d6d6
| 514293 ||  || — || October 11, 2010 || Mount Lemmon || Mount Lemmon Survey ||  || align=right | 2.7 km || 
|-id=294 bgcolor=#d6d6d6
| 514294 ||  || — || February 21, 2007 || Mount Lemmon || Mount Lemmon Survey ||  || align=right | 3.5 km || 
|-id=295 bgcolor=#E9E9E9
| 514295 ||  || — || October 4, 2006 || Mount Lemmon || Mount Lemmon Survey ||  || align=right | 2.1 km || 
|-id=296 bgcolor=#d6d6d6
| 514296 ||  || — || October 8, 2015 || Haleakala || Pan-STARRS ||  || align=right | 3.2 km || 
|-id=297 bgcolor=#d6d6d6
| 514297 ||  || — || April 13, 2013 || Kitt Peak || Spacewatch ||  || align=right | 3.1 km || 
|-id=298 bgcolor=#E9E9E9
| 514298 ||  || — || January 10, 1999 || Kitt Peak || Spacewatch ||  || align=right | 1.2 km || 
|-id=299 bgcolor=#E9E9E9
| 514299 ||  || — || March 16, 2009 || Kitt Peak || Spacewatch ||  || align=right | 2.0 km || 
|-id=300 bgcolor=#d6d6d6
| 514300 ||  || — || May 21, 2014 || Haleakala || Pan-STARRS ||  || align=right | 2.4 km || 
|}

514301–514400 

|-bgcolor=#d6d6d6
| 514301 ||  || — || September 10, 2010 || Mount Lemmon || Mount Lemmon Survey || BRA || align=right | 1.7 km || 
|-id=302 bgcolor=#d6d6d6
| 514302 ||  || — || December 2, 2010 || Mount Lemmon || Mount Lemmon Survey ||  || align=right | 3.2 km || 
|-id=303 bgcolor=#E9E9E9
| 514303 ||  || — || August 17, 1998 || Socorro || LINEAR ||  || align=right | 1.7 km || 
|-id=304 bgcolor=#d6d6d6
| 514304 ||  || — || September 25, 2008 || Kitt Peak || Spacewatch || 7:4 || align=right | 3.4 km || 
|-id=305 bgcolor=#d6d6d6
| 514305 ||  || — || August 15, 2009 || Kitt Peak || Spacewatch ||  || align=right | 3.2 km || 
|-id=306 bgcolor=#d6d6d6
| 514306 ||  || — || March 9, 2007 || Mount Lemmon || Mount Lemmon Survey ||  || align=right | 3.0 km || 
|-id=307 bgcolor=#d6d6d6
| 514307 ||  || — || October 8, 2015 || Haleakala || Pan-STARRS ||  || align=right | 3.9 km || 
|-id=308 bgcolor=#C2FFFF
| 514308 ||  || — || July 28, 2012 || Haleakala || Pan-STARRS || L5 || align=right | 9.3 km || 
|-id=309 bgcolor=#C2FFFF
| 514309 ||  || — || January 15, 2005 || Kitt Peak || Spacewatch || L5 || align=right | 8.5 km || 
|-id=310 bgcolor=#C2FFFF
| 514310 ||  || — || October 29, 2014 || Kitt Peak || Spacewatch || L5 || align=right | 7.7 km || 
|-id=311 bgcolor=#d6d6d6
| 514311 ||  || — || November 30, 2005 || Kitt Peak || Spacewatch ||  || align=right | 3.3 km || 
|-id=312 bgcolor=#C2E0FF
| 514312 ||  || — || October 26, 2006 || Lulin || Lulin Obs. || centaur || align=right | 94 km || 
|-id=313 bgcolor=#FA8072
| 514313 ||  || — || June 1, 2012 || Mount Lemmon || Mount Lemmon Survey ||  || align=right data-sort-value="0.62" | 620 m || 
|-id=314 bgcolor=#E9E9E9
| 514314 ||  || — || August 23, 2008 || Siding Spring || SSS ||  || align=right | 3.6 km || 
|-id=315 bgcolor=#fefefe
| 514315 ||  || — || September 28, 2014 || Haleakala || Pan-STARRS || H || align=right data-sort-value="0.74" | 740 m || 
|-id=316 bgcolor=#E9E9E9
| 514316 ||  || — || November 8, 2009 || Mount Lemmon || Mount Lemmon Survey ||  || align=right | 1.4 km || 
|-id=317 bgcolor=#fefefe
| 514317 ||  || — || May 24, 2011 || Haleakala || Pan-STARRS || H || align=right data-sort-value="0.54" | 540 m || 
|-id=318 bgcolor=#fefefe
| 514318 ||  || — || June 4, 2011 || Kitt Peak || Spacewatch || H || align=right data-sort-value="0.52" | 520 m || 
|-id=319 bgcolor=#FA8072
| 514319 ||  || — || April 4, 2013 || Haleakala || Pan-STARRS || H || align=right data-sort-value="0.54" | 540 m || 
|-id=320 bgcolor=#fefefe
| 514320 ||  || — || June 3, 2013 || Kitt Peak || Spacewatch || H || align=right data-sort-value="0.66" | 660 m || 
|-id=321 bgcolor=#E9E9E9
| 514321 ||  || — || March 25, 2007 || Mount Lemmon || Mount Lemmon Survey ||  || align=right data-sort-value="0.93" | 930 m || 
|-id=322 bgcolor=#d6d6d6
| 514322 ||  || — || October 20, 2011 || Siding Spring || SSS || Tj (2.98) || align=right | 3.5 km || 
|-id=323 bgcolor=#fefefe
| 514323 ||  || — || January 20, 2015 || Mount Lemmon || Mount Lemmon Survey || H || align=right data-sort-value="0.59" | 590 m || 
|-id=324 bgcolor=#E9E9E9
| 514324 ||  || — || September 15, 2012 || Catalina || CSS ||  || align=right | 1.7 km || 
|-id=325 bgcolor=#fefefe
| 514325 ||  || — || February 18, 2008 || Mount Lemmon || Mount Lemmon Survey ||  || align=right data-sort-value="0.93" | 930 m || 
|-id=326 bgcolor=#d6d6d6
| 514326 ||  || — || December 6, 2011 || Haleakala || Pan-STARRS ||  || align=right | 3.2 km || 
|-id=327 bgcolor=#fefefe
| 514327 ||  || — || December 27, 2006 || Mount Lemmon || Mount Lemmon Survey ||  || align=right data-sort-value="0.66" | 660 m || 
|-id=328 bgcolor=#E9E9E9
| 514328 ||  || — || September 3, 2007 || Mount Lemmon || Mount Lemmon Survey ||  || align=right | 4.5 km || 
|-id=329 bgcolor=#d6d6d6
| 514329 ||  || — || November 11, 2007 || Mount Lemmon || Mount Lemmon Survey ||  || align=right | 2.9 km || 
|-id=330 bgcolor=#fefefe
| 514330 ||  || — || November 9, 2013 || Haleakala || Pan-STARRS ||  || align=right data-sort-value="0.60" | 600 m || 
|-id=331 bgcolor=#fefefe
| 514331 ||  || — || January 27, 2007 || Kitt Peak || Spacewatch || H || align=right data-sort-value="0.75" | 750 m || 
|-id=332 bgcolor=#E9E9E9
| 514332 ||  || — || September 18, 2007 || Catalina || CSS ||  || align=right | 2.4 km || 
|-id=333 bgcolor=#E9E9E9
| 514333 ||  || — || November 26, 2012 || Mount Lemmon || Mount Lemmon Survey ||  || align=right | 2.0 km || 
|-id=334 bgcolor=#E9E9E9
| 514334 ||  || — || September 23, 2008 || Kitt Peak || Spacewatch ||  || align=right data-sort-value="0.72" | 720 m || 
|-id=335 bgcolor=#d6d6d6
| 514335 ||  || — || August 10, 2016 || Haleakala || Pan-STARRS ||  || align=right | 2.8 km || 
|-id=336 bgcolor=#fefefe
| 514336 ||  || — || April 5, 2011 || Mount Lemmon || Mount Lemmon Survey ||  || align=right data-sort-value="0.76" | 760 m || 
|-id=337 bgcolor=#fefefe
| 514337 ||  || — || January 30, 2011 || Mount Lemmon || Mount Lemmon Survey ||  || align=right data-sort-value="0.83" | 830 m || 
|-id=338 bgcolor=#E9E9E9
| 514338 ||  || — || August 10, 2016 || Haleakala || Pan-STARRS ||  || align=right | 1.4 km || 
|-id=339 bgcolor=#E9E9E9
| 514339 ||  || — || November 20, 2012 || Catalina || CSS ||  || align=right | 1.9 km || 
|-id=340 bgcolor=#fefefe
| 514340 ||  || — || October 27, 2005 || Mount Lemmon || Mount Lemmon Survey ||  || align=right data-sort-value="0.74" | 740 m || 
|-id=341 bgcolor=#E9E9E9
| 514341 ||  || — || March 18, 2010 || Kitt Peak || Spacewatch ||  || align=right | 1.6 km || 
|-id=342 bgcolor=#d6d6d6
| 514342 ||  || — || October 31, 2006 || Mount Lemmon || Mount Lemmon Survey ||  || align=right | 2.6 km || 
|-id=343 bgcolor=#d6d6d6
| 514343 ||  || — || September 4, 2010 || Mount Lemmon || Mount Lemmon Survey ||  || align=right | 2.2 km || 
|-id=344 bgcolor=#d6d6d6
| 514344 ||  || — || October 1, 2005 || Mount Lemmon || Mount Lemmon Survey ||  || align=right | 2.7 km || 
|-id=345 bgcolor=#fefefe
| 514345 ||  || — || September 30, 1997 || Caussols || ODAS ||  || align=right | 1.2 km || 
|-id=346 bgcolor=#E9E9E9
| 514346 ||  || — || May 7, 2007 || Mount Lemmon || Mount Lemmon Survey ||  || align=right data-sort-value="0.98" | 980 m || 
|-id=347 bgcolor=#E9E9E9
| 514347 ||  || — || November 26, 2012 || Mount Lemmon || Mount Lemmon Survey ||  || align=right | 2.1 km || 
|-id=348 bgcolor=#E9E9E9
| 514348 ||  || — || October 14, 2007 || Mount Lemmon || Mount Lemmon Survey ||  || align=right | 1.8 km || 
|-id=349 bgcolor=#E9E9E9
| 514349 ||  || — || September 10, 2007 || Mount Lemmon || Mount Lemmon Survey ||  || align=right | 2.3 km || 
|-id=350 bgcolor=#E9E9E9
| 514350 ||  || — || October 16, 2007 || Mount Lemmon || Mount Lemmon Survey ||  || align=right | 1.7 km || 
|-id=351 bgcolor=#fefefe
| 514351 ||  || — || January 30, 2008 || Mount Lemmon || Mount Lemmon Survey ||  || align=right data-sort-value="0.74" | 740 m || 
|-id=352 bgcolor=#fefefe
| 514352 ||  || — || March 5, 2008 || Mount Lemmon || Mount Lemmon Survey ||  || align=right data-sort-value="0.61" | 610 m || 
|-id=353 bgcolor=#E9E9E9
| 514353 ||  || — || November 8, 2008 || Mount Lemmon || Mount Lemmon Survey ||  || align=right | 2.4 km || 
|-id=354 bgcolor=#E9E9E9
| 514354 ||  || — || October 19, 2012 || Mount Lemmon || Mount Lemmon Survey ||  || align=right | 1.1 km || 
|-id=355 bgcolor=#E9E9E9
| 514355 ||  || — || March 3, 2006 || Kitt Peak || Spacewatch ||  || align=right data-sort-value="0.91" | 910 m || 
|-id=356 bgcolor=#E9E9E9
| 514356 ||  || — || October 6, 2008 || Catalina || CSS ||  || align=right | 1.1 km || 
|-id=357 bgcolor=#E9E9E9
| 514357 ||  || — || April 23, 2015 || Haleakala || Pan-STARRS ||  || align=right data-sort-value="0.86" | 860 m || 
|-id=358 bgcolor=#fefefe
| 514358 ||  || — || September 2, 2013 || Mount Lemmon || Mount Lemmon Survey ||  || align=right data-sort-value="0.69" | 690 m || 
|-id=359 bgcolor=#fefefe
| 514359 ||  || — || January 30, 2011 || Haleakala || Pan-STARRS ||  || align=right data-sort-value="0.60" | 600 m || 
|-id=360 bgcolor=#fefefe
| 514360 ||  || — || May 12, 2012 || Mount Lemmon || Mount Lemmon Survey ||  || align=right data-sort-value="0.86" | 860 m || 
|-id=361 bgcolor=#fefefe
| 514361 ||  || — || April 5, 2008 || Mount Lemmon || Mount Lemmon Survey ||  || align=right data-sort-value="0.76" | 760 m || 
|-id=362 bgcolor=#E9E9E9
| 514362 ||  || — || October 19, 2012 || Mount Lemmon || Mount Lemmon Survey ||  || align=right | 1.6 km || 
|-id=363 bgcolor=#d6d6d6
| 514363 ||  || — || April 11, 2008 || Mount Lemmon || Mount Lemmon Survey ||  || align=right | 2.4 km || 
|-id=364 bgcolor=#E9E9E9
| 514364 ||  || — || July 7, 2016 || Haleakala || Pan-STARRS ||  || align=right | 1.7 km || 
|-id=365 bgcolor=#fefefe
| 514365 ||  || — || December 3, 2010 || Mount Lemmon || Mount Lemmon Survey ||  || align=right data-sort-value="0.59" | 590 m || 
|-id=366 bgcolor=#d6d6d6
| 514366 ||  || — || November 18, 2011 || Mount Lemmon || Mount Lemmon Survey ||  || align=right | 2.6 km || 
|-id=367 bgcolor=#fefefe
| 514367 ||  || — || December 30, 2013 || Kitt Peak || Spacewatch ||  || align=right data-sort-value="0.73" | 730 m || 
|-id=368 bgcolor=#E9E9E9
| 514368 ||  || — || September 11, 2007 || Kitt Peak || Spacewatch ||  || align=right | 1.4 km || 
|-id=369 bgcolor=#E9E9E9
| 514369 ||  || — || March 3, 2005 || Catalina || CSS ||  || align=right | 1.8 km || 
|-id=370 bgcolor=#d6d6d6
| 514370 ||  || — || October 30, 2006 || Catalina || CSS ||  || align=right | 3.1 km || 
|-id=371 bgcolor=#d6d6d6
| 514371 ||  || — || October 8, 2005 || Catalina || CSS ||  || align=right | 3.5 km || 
|-id=372 bgcolor=#E9E9E9
| 514372 ||  || — || October 30, 2007 || Mount Lemmon || Mount Lemmon Survey ||  || align=right | 1.7 km || 
|-id=373 bgcolor=#E9E9E9
| 514373 ||  || — || September 13, 2007 || Mount Lemmon || Mount Lemmon Survey ||  || align=right | 2.3 km || 
|-id=374 bgcolor=#E9E9E9
| 514374 ||  || — || December 30, 2008 || Kitt Peak || Spacewatch ||  || align=right | 1.3 km || 
|-id=375 bgcolor=#d6d6d6
| 514375 ||  || — || September 12, 2005 || Kitt Peak || Spacewatch ||  || align=right | 2.4 km || 
|-id=376 bgcolor=#E9E9E9
| 514376 ||  || — || October 7, 2008 || Kitt Peak || Spacewatch ||  || align=right data-sort-value="0.74" | 740 m || 
|-id=377 bgcolor=#E9E9E9
| 514377 ||  || — || October 7, 2012 || Haleakala || Pan-STARRS ||  || align=right | 1.4 km || 
|-id=378 bgcolor=#E9E9E9
| 514378 ||  || — || September 13, 2007 || Mount Lemmon || Mount Lemmon Survey ||  || align=right | 1.5 km || 
|-id=379 bgcolor=#d6d6d6
| 514379 ||  || — || April 30, 2010 || WISE || WISE ||  || align=right | 3.9 km || 
|-id=380 bgcolor=#fefefe
| 514380 ||  || — || August 25, 2012 || Haleakala || Pan-STARRS ||  || align=right data-sort-value="0.79" | 790 m || 
|-id=381 bgcolor=#fefefe
| 514381 ||  || — || March 29, 2015 || Haleakala || Pan-STARRS ||  || align=right data-sort-value="0.83" | 830 m || 
|-id=382 bgcolor=#d6d6d6
| 514382 ||  || — || May 25, 2010 || WISE || WISE ||  || align=right | 3.3 km || 
|-id=383 bgcolor=#E9E9E9
| 514383 ||  || — || January 18, 2009 || Kitt Peak || Spacewatch ||  || align=right | 2.4 km || 
|-id=384 bgcolor=#d6d6d6
| 514384 ||  || — || August 30, 2016 || Haleakala || Pan-STARRS ||  || align=right | 3.0 km || 
|-id=385 bgcolor=#E9E9E9
| 514385 ||  || — || September 3, 2016 || Kitt Peak || Spacewatch ||  || align=right | 1.7 km || 
|-id=386 bgcolor=#E9E9E9
| 514386 ||  || — || October 20, 2012 || Haleakala || Pan-STARRS ||  || align=right | 1.9 km || 
|-id=387 bgcolor=#E9E9E9
| 514387 ||  || — || October 13, 2007 || Mount Lemmon || Mount Lemmon Survey ||  || align=right | 1.5 km || 
|-id=388 bgcolor=#E9E9E9
| 514388 ||  || — || September 15, 2007 || Kitt Peak || Spacewatch ||  || align=right | 1.7 km || 
|-id=389 bgcolor=#E9E9E9
| 514389 ||  || — || October 29, 2008 || Mount Lemmon || Mount Lemmon Survey ||  || align=right data-sort-value="0.99" | 990 m || 
|-id=390 bgcolor=#fefefe
| 514390 ||  || — || January 10, 2014 || Mount Lemmon || Mount Lemmon Survey ||  || align=right data-sort-value="0.83" | 830 m || 
|-id=391 bgcolor=#fefefe
| 514391 ||  || — || September 29, 2005 || Kitt Peak || Spacewatch ||  || align=right data-sort-value="0.76" | 760 m || 
|-id=392 bgcolor=#d6d6d6
| 514392 ||  || — || February 28, 2009 || Kitt Peak || Spacewatch ||  || align=right | 1.9 km || 
|-id=393 bgcolor=#E9E9E9
| 514393 ||  || — || October 16, 2012 || Catalina || CSS ||  || align=right | 1.1 km || 
|-id=394 bgcolor=#E9E9E9
| 514394 ||  || — || January 1, 2009 || Mount Lemmon || Mount Lemmon Survey ||  || align=right | 1.3 km || 
|-id=395 bgcolor=#d6d6d6
| 514395 ||  || — || October 21, 2011 || Mount Lemmon || Mount Lemmon Survey ||  || align=right | 2.1 km || 
|-id=396 bgcolor=#fefefe
| 514396 ||  || — || August 4, 2003 || Kitt Peak || Spacewatch ||  || align=right data-sort-value="0.60" | 600 m || 
|-id=397 bgcolor=#fefefe
| 514397 ||  || — || October 1, 2000 || Kitt Peak || Spacewatch ||  || align=right data-sort-value="0.61" | 610 m || 
|-id=398 bgcolor=#E9E9E9
| 514398 ||  || — || October 19, 2003 || Kitt Peak || Spacewatch ||  || align=right | 1.3 km || 
|-id=399 bgcolor=#E9E9E9
| 514399 ||  || — || October 9, 2008 || Kitt Peak || Spacewatch ||  || align=right data-sort-value="0.82" | 820 m || 
|-id=400 bgcolor=#d6d6d6
| 514400 ||  || — || May 16, 2009 || Kitt Peak || Spacewatch ||  || align=right | 2.2 km || 
|}

514401–514500 

|-bgcolor=#d6d6d6
| 514401 ||  || — || July 17, 2010 || WISE || WISE ||  || align=right | 4.8 km || 
|-id=402 bgcolor=#d6d6d6
| 514402 ||  || — || May 28, 2014 || Haleakala || Pan-STARRS ||  || align=right | 2.9 km || 
|-id=403 bgcolor=#fefefe
| 514403 ||  || — || November 12, 2005 || Kitt Peak || Spacewatch ||  || align=right data-sort-value="0.69" | 690 m || 
|-id=404 bgcolor=#E9E9E9
| 514404 ||  || — || September 14, 2007 || Mount Lemmon || Mount Lemmon Survey ||  || align=right | 1.7 km || 
|-id=405 bgcolor=#E9E9E9
| 514405 ||  || — || December 29, 2008 || Mount Lemmon || Mount Lemmon Survey ||  || align=right | 1.4 km || 
|-id=406 bgcolor=#E9E9E9
| 514406 ||  || — || December 9, 1996 || Kitt Peak || Spacewatch ||  || align=right | 1.2 km || 
|-id=407 bgcolor=#fefefe
| 514407 ||  || — || November 5, 2005 || Kitt Peak || Spacewatch ||  || align=right data-sort-value="0.93" | 930 m || 
|-id=408 bgcolor=#E9E9E9
| 514408 ||  || — || September 11, 2007 || Mount Lemmon || Mount Lemmon Survey ||  || align=right | 1.4 km || 
|-id=409 bgcolor=#fefefe
| 514409 ||  || — || March 1, 2011 || Mount Lemmon || Mount Lemmon Survey ||  || align=right data-sort-value="0.77" | 770 m || 
|-id=410 bgcolor=#fefefe
| 514410 ||  || — || January 30, 2011 || Haleakala || Pan-STARRS ||  || align=right data-sort-value="0.92" | 920 m || 
|-id=411 bgcolor=#E9E9E9
| 514411 ||  || — || January 1, 2009 || Mount Lemmon || Mount Lemmon Survey ||  || align=right | 1.1 km || 
|-id=412 bgcolor=#E9E9E9
| 514412 ||  || — || March 12, 2005 || Kitt Peak || Spacewatch ||  || align=right | 1.4 km || 
|-id=413 bgcolor=#fefefe
| 514413 ||  || — || December 29, 2014 || Haleakala || Pan-STARRS ||  || align=right | 1.1 km || 
|-id=414 bgcolor=#E9E9E9
| 514414 ||  || — || February 26, 2014 || Mount Lemmon || Mount Lemmon Survey ||  || align=right | 1.9 km || 
|-id=415 bgcolor=#d6d6d6
| 514415 ||  || — || October 3, 2005 || Kitt Peak || Spacewatch ||  || align=right | 2.2 km || 
|-id=416 bgcolor=#d6d6d6
| 514416 ||  || — || May 8, 2014 || Haleakala || Pan-STARRS ||  || align=right | 2.8 km || 
|-id=417 bgcolor=#d6d6d6
| 514417 ||  || — || January 27, 2007 || Mount Lemmon || Mount Lemmon Survey ||  || align=right | 3.4 km || 
|-id=418 bgcolor=#d6d6d6
| 514418 ||  || — || November 16, 2011 || Mount Lemmon || Mount Lemmon Survey ||  || align=right | 3.3 km || 
|-id=419 bgcolor=#E9E9E9
| 514419 ||  || — || November 18, 2007 || Kitt Peak || Spacewatch ||  || align=right | 2.2 km || 
|-id=420 bgcolor=#fefefe
| 514420 ||  || — || September 22, 2012 || Kitt Peak || Spacewatch ||  || align=right data-sort-value="0.80" | 800 m || 
|-id=421 bgcolor=#d6d6d6
| 514421 ||  || — || March 8, 2008 || Mount Lemmon || Mount Lemmon Survey ||  || align=right | 5.3 km || 
|-id=422 bgcolor=#d6d6d6
| 514422 ||  || — || July 24, 2015 || Haleakala || Pan-STARRS ||  || align=right | 2.7 km || 
|-id=423 bgcolor=#fefefe
| 514423 ||  || — || March 19, 2007 || Mount Lemmon || Mount Lemmon Survey ||  || align=right data-sort-value="0.82" | 820 m || 
|-id=424 bgcolor=#d6d6d6
| 514424 ||  || — || September 24, 2008 || Kitt Peak || Spacewatch || 3:2 || align=right | 4.6 km || 
|-id=425 bgcolor=#E9E9E9
| 514425 ||  || — || November 9, 2007 || Kitt Peak || Spacewatch ||  || align=right | 1.7 km || 
|-id=426 bgcolor=#E9E9E9
| 514426 ||  || — || October 10, 2012 || Haleakala || Pan-STARRS ||  || align=right data-sort-value="0.96" | 960 m || 
|-id=427 bgcolor=#E9E9E9
| 514427 ||  || — || November 7, 2012 || Haleakala || Pan-STARRS ||  || align=right | 1.1 km || 
|-id=428 bgcolor=#fefefe
| 514428 ||  || — || July 28, 2008 || Mount Lemmon || Mount Lemmon Survey ||  || align=right data-sort-value="0.77" | 770 m || 
|-id=429 bgcolor=#fefefe
| 514429 ||  || — || November 27, 2010 || Mount Lemmon || Mount Lemmon Survey ||  || align=right data-sort-value="0.61" | 610 m || 
|-id=430 bgcolor=#fefefe
| 514430 ||  || — || September 20, 2009 || Mount Lemmon || Mount Lemmon Survey ||  || align=right data-sort-value="0.80" | 800 m || 
|-id=431 bgcolor=#fefefe
| 514431 ||  || — || March 17, 2015 || Haleakala || Pan-STARRS ||  || align=right data-sort-value="0.82" | 820 m || 
|-id=432 bgcolor=#E9E9E9
| 514432 ||  || — || October 29, 2003 || Kitt Peak || Spacewatch ||  || align=right | 1.9 km || 
|-id=433 bgcolor=#E9E9E9
| 514433 ||  || — || June 26, 2011 || Mount Lemmon || Mount Lemmon Survey ||  || align=right | 2.2 km || 
|-id=434 bgcolor=#E9E9E9
| 514434 ||  || — || November 12, 2012 || Mount Lemmon || Mount Lemmon Survey ||  || align=right | 2.1 km || 
|-id=435 bgcolor=#fefefe
| 514435 ||  || — || October 16, 2006 || Catalina || CSS ||  || align=right data-sort-value="0.68" | 680 m || 
|-id=436 bgcolor=#E9E9E9
| 514436 ||  || — || October 8, 2007 || Kitt Peak || Spacewatch ||  || align=right | 2.0 km || 
|-id=437 bgcolor=#fefefe
| 514437 ||  || — || August 26, 2009 || La Sagra || OAM Obs. ||  || align=right data-sort-value="0.62" | 620 m || 
|-id=438 bgcolor=#d6d6d6
| 514438 ||  || — || October 16, 2006 || Kitt Peak || Spacewatch ||  || align=right | 2.0 km || 
|-id=439 bgcolor=#E9E9E9
| 514439 ||  || — || March 3, 2009 || Mount Lemmon || Mount Lemmon Survey ||  || align=right | 2.2 km || 
|-id=440 bgcolor=#E9E9E9
| 514440 ||  || — || February 1, 2009 || Kitt Peak || Spacewatch ||  || align=right | 2.1 km || 
|-id=441 bgcolor=#E9E9E9
| 514441 ||  || — || September 24, 1995 || Kitt Peak || Spacewatch ||  || align=right | 1.1 km || 
|-id=442 bgcolor=#fefefe
| 514442 ||  || — || October 10, 1994 || Kitt Peak || Spacewatch ||  || align=right data-sort-value="0.94" | 940 m || 
|-id=443 bgcolor=#d6d6d6
| 514443 ||  || — || November 2, 2011 || Mount Lemmon || Mount Lemmon Survey ||  || align=right | 2.4 km || 
|-id=444 bgcolor=#E9E9E9
| 514444 ||  || — || July 28, 2011 || Haleakala || Pan-STARRS ||  || align=right | 1.6 km || 
|-id=445 bgcolor=#E9E9E9
| 514445 ||  || — || September 19, 1995 || Kitt Peak || Spacewatch ||  || align=right data-sort-value="0.93" | 930 m || 
|-id=446 bgcolor=#fefefe
| 514446 ||  || — || March 26, 2007 || Mount Lemmon || Mount Lemmon Survey ||  || align=right data-sort-value="0.79" | 790 m || 
|-id=447 bgcolor=#fefefe
| 514447 ||  || — || May 8, 2005 || Kitt Peak || Spacewatch ||  || align=right data-sort-value="0.68" | 680 m || 
|-id=448 bgcolor=#E9E9E9
| 514448 ||  || — || September 21, 2011 || Haleakala || Pan-STARRS ||  || align=right | 2.1 km || 
|-id=449 bgcolor=#E9E9E9
| 514449 ||  || — || December 22, 2003 || Kitt Peak || Spacewatch ||  || align=right | 2.1 km || 
|-id=450 bgcolor=#E9E9E9
| 514450 ||  || — || October 16, 2012 || Kitt Peak || Spacewatch ||  || align=right | 1.6 km || 
|-id=451 bgcolor=#E9E9E9
| 514451 ||  || — || October 22, 2012 || Haleakala || Pan-STARRS ||  || align=right data-sort-value="0.81" | 810 m || 
|-id=452 bgcolor=#d6d6d6
| 514452 ||  || — || November 25, 2005 || Mount Lemmon || Mount Lemmon Survey ||  || align=right | 3.0 km || 
|-id=453 bgcolor=#d6d6d6
| 514453 ||  || — || September 25, 2006 || Mount Lemmon || Mount Lemmon Survey ||  || align=right | 1.8 km || 
|-id=454 bgcolor=#d6d6d6
| 514454 ||  || — || October 26, 2011 || Haleakala || Pan-STARRS ||  || align=right | 2.2 km || 
|-id=455 bgcolor=#E9E9E9
| 514455 ||  || — || September 10, 2007 || Kitt Peak || Spacewatch ||  || align=right | 1.3 km || 
|-id=456 bgcolor=#d6d6d6
| 514456 ||  || — || March 31, 2009 || Kitt Peak || Spacewatch ||  || align=right | 3.2 km || 
|-id=457 bgcolor=#E9E9E9
| 514457 ||  || — || March 18, 2010 || Kitt Peak || Spacewatch ||  || align=right | 1.3 km || 
|-id=458 bgcolor=#E9E9E9
| 514458 ||  || — || September 13, 2007 || Mount Lemmon || Mount Lemmon Survey ||  || align=right | 1.2 km || 
|-id=459 bgcolor=#E9E9E9
| 514459 ||  || — || December 3, 2012 || Mount Lemmon || Mount Lemmon Survey ||  || align=right | 1.3 km || 
|-id=460 bgcolor=#E9E9E9
| 514460 ||  || — || March 8, 2005 || Kitt Peak || Spacewatch ||  || align=right | 1.3 km || 
|-id=461 bgcolor=#E9E9E9
| 514461 ||  || — || November 30, 2003 || Kitt Peak || Spacewatch ||  || align=right | 1.5 km || 
|-id=462 bgcolor=#fefefe
| 514462 ||  || — || March 27, 2008 || Mount Lemmon || Mount Lemmon Survey ||  || align=right data-sort-value="0.65" | 650 m || 
|-id=463 bgcolor=#E9E9E9
| 514463 ||  || — || October 7, 2007 || Mount Lemmon || Mount Lemmon Survey ||  || align=right | 1.6 km || 
|-id=464 bgcolor=#E9E9E9
| 514464 ||  || — || October 23, 2008 || Kitt Peak || Spacewatch ||  || align=right data-sort-value="0.98" | 980 m || 
|-id=465 bgcolor=#d6d6d6
| 514465 ||  || — || December 22, 2005 || Catalina || CSS ||  || align=right | 3.7 km || 
|-id=466 bgcolor=#d6d6d6
| 514466 ||  || — || September 30, 2016 || Haleakala || Pan-STARRS ||  || align=right | 2.9 km || 
|-id=467 bgcolor=#d6d6d6
| 514467 ||  || — || November 25, 2011 || Haleakala || Pan-STARRS || EOS || align=right | 1.8 km || 
|-id=468 bgcolor=#d6d6d6
| 514468 ||  || — || June 30, 2010 || WISE || WISE ||  || align=right | 2.8 km || 
|-id=469 bgcolor=#d6d6d6
| 514469 ||  || — || April 5, 2014 || Haleakala || Pan-STARRS ||  || align=right | 3.1 km || 
|-id=470 bgcolor=#d6d6d6
| 514470 ||  || — || October 8, 2005 || Kitt Peak || Spacewatch ||  || align=right | 2.8 km || 
|-id=471 bgcolor=#E9E9E9
| 514471 ||  || — || November 24, 2008 || Mount Lemmon || Mount Lemmon Survey ||  || align=right | 1.3 km || 
|-id=472 bgcolor=#E9E9E9
| 514472 ||  || — || September 8, 2011 || Kitt Peak || Spacewatch ||  || align=right | 1.7 km || 
|-id=473 bgcolor=#E9E9E9
| 514473 ||  || — || February 9, 2005 || Mount Lemmon || Mount Lemmon Survey ||  || align=right | 1.5 km || 
|-id=474 bgcolor=#E9E9E9
| 514474 ||  || — || April 9, 2010 || Kitt Peak || Spacewatch ||  || align=right | 1.2 km || 
|-id=475 bgcolor=#d6d6d6
| 514475 ||  || — || October 9, 2010 || Mount Lemmon || Mount Lemmon Survey ||  || align=right | 1.9 km || 
|-id=476 bgcolor=#E9E9E9
| 514476 ||  || — || March 15, 2010 || Mount Lemmon || Mount Lemmon Survey ||  || align=right | 1.3 km || 
|-id=477 bgcolor=#d6d6d6
| 514477 ||  || — || October 21, 2011 || Kitt Peak || Spacewatch ||  || align=right | 2.0 km || 
|-id=478 bgcolor=#E9E9E9
| 514478 ||  || — || October 11, 2007 || Mount Lemmon || Mount Lemmon Survey ||  || align=right | 1.6 km || 
|-id=479 bgcolor=#d6d6d6
| 514479 ||  || — || May 29, 2009 || Mount Lemmon || Mount Lemmon Survey ||  || align=right | 4.1 km || 
|-id=480 bgcolor=#E9E9E9
| 514480 ||  || — || September 3, 1999 || Kitt Peak || Spacewatch ||  || align=right | 1.1 km || 
|-id=481 bgcolor=#d6d6d6
| 514481 ||  || — || October 27, 2005 || Anderson Mesa || LONEOS ||  || align=right | 2.5 km || 
|-id=482 bgcolor=#E9E9E9
| 514482 ||  || — || October 27, 2008 || Mount Lemmon || Mount Lemmon Survey ||  || align=right | 1.0 km || 
|-id=483 bgcolor=#E9E9E9
| 514483 ||  || — || March 13, 2010 || Mount Lemmon || Mount Lemmon Survey ||  || align=right | 1.2 km || 
|-id=484 bgcolor=#d6d6d6
| 514484 ||  || — || March 11, 2008 || Kitt Peak || Spacewatch ||  || align=right | 3.3 km || 
|-id=485 bgcolor=#d6d6d6
| 514485 ||  || — || May 21, 2014 || Haleakala || Pan-STARRS ||  || align=right | 2.4 km || 
|-id=486 bgcolor=#E9E9E9
| 514486 ||  || — || October 16, 2003 || Kitt Peak || Spacewatch ||  || align=right | 1.8 km || 
|-id=487 bgcolor=#E9E9E9
| 514487 ||  || — || December 3, 2012 || Mount Lemmon || Mount Lemmon Survey ||  || align=right | 1.4 km || 
|-id=488 bgcolor=#d6d6d6
| 514488 ||  || — || October 11, 2010 || Kitt Peak || Spacewatch ||  || align=right | 3.5 km || 
|-id=489 bgcolor=#E9E9E9
| 514489 ||  || — || December 6, 2012 || Kitt Peak || Spacewatch ||  || align=right | 1.9 km || 
|-id=490 bgcolor=#d6d6d6
| 514490 ||  || — || January 30, 2012 || Mount Lemmon || Mount Lemmon Survey ||  || align=right | 2.7 km || 
|-id=491 bgcolor=#E9E9E9
| 514491 ||  || — || May 25, 2015 || Haleakala || Pan-STARRS ||  || align=right data-sort-value="0.99" | 990 m || 
|-id=492 bgcolor=#d6d6d6
| 514492 ||  || — || September 19, 2006 || Kitt Peak || Spacewatch ||  || align=right | 1.7 km || 
|-id=493 bgcolor=#E9E9E9
| 514493 ||  || — || December 6, 2012 || Mount Lemmon || Mount Lemmon Survey ||  || align=right | 1.00 km || 
|-id=494 bgcolor=#E9E9E9
| 514494 ||  || — || March 8, 2005 || Kitt Peak || Spacewatch ||  || align=right | 1.8 km || 
|-id=495 bgcolor=#E9E9E9
| 514495 ||  || — || April 4, 2014 || Haleakala || Pan-STARRS ||  || align=right | 1.4 km || 
|-id=496 bgcolor=#d6d6d6
| 514496 ||  || — || October 27, 2005 || Mount Lemmon || Mount Lemmon Survey ||  || align=right | 2.5 km || 
|-id=497 bgcolor=#E9E9E9
| 514497 ||  || — || October 21, 2003 || Kitt Peak || Spacewatch ||  || align=right | 1.5 km || 
|-id=498 bgcolor=#d6d6d6
| 514498 ||  || — || December 6, 2005 || Kitt Peak || Spacewatch ||  || align=right | 2.6 km || 
|-id=499 bgcolor=#E9E9E9
| 514499 ||  || — || December 23, 2012 || Haleakala || Pan-STARRS ||  || align=right | 2.0 km || 
|-id=500 bgcolor=#d6d6d6
| 514500 ||  || — || September 24, 2011 || Haleakala || Pan-STARRS ||  || align=right | 2.1 km || 
|}

514501–514600 

|-bgcolor=#d6d6d6
| 514501 ||  || — || December 25, 2011 || Catalina || CSS ||  || align=right | 3.5 km || 
|-id=502 bgcolor=#d6d6d6
| 514502 ||  || — || July 7, 2014 || Haleakala || Pan-STARRS ||  || align=right | 3.4 km || 
|-id=503 bgcolor=#E9E9E9
| 514503 ||  || — || January 28, 2014 || Kitt Peak || Spacewatch ||  || align=right | 1.3 km || 
|-id=504 bgcolor=#E9E9E9
| 514504 ||  || — || February 19, 2009 || Kitt Peak || Spacewatch ||  || align=right | 1.7 km || 
|-id=505 bgcolor=#d6d6d6
| 514505 ||  || — || October 28, 2010 || Mount Lemmon || Mount Lemmon Survey ||  || align=right | 2.5 km || 
|-id=506 bgcolor=#E9E9E9
| 514506 ||  || — || December 12, 2012 || Mount Lemmon || Mount Lemmon Survey ||  || align=right data-sort-value="0.92" | 920 m || 
|-id=507 bgcolor=#d6d6d6
| 514507 ||  || — || February 8, 2007 || Kitt Peak || Spacewatch ||  || align=right | 2.9 km || 
|-id=508 bgcolor=#E9E9E9
| 514508 ||  || — || September 18, 2011 || Mount Lemmon || Mount Lemmon Survey ||  || align=right | 1.9 km || 
|-id=509 bgcolor=#fefefe
| 514509 ||  || — || April 3, 2011 || Haleakala || Pan-STARRS ||  || align=right data-sort-value="0.98" | 980 m || 
|-id=510 bgcolor=#E9E9E9
| 514510 ||  || — || November 2, 2007 || Kitt Peak || Spacewatch ||  || align=right | 2.3 km || 
|-id=511 bgcolor=#d6d6d6
| 514511 ||  || — || September 4, 2010 || Mount Lemmon || Mount Lemmon Survey ||  || align=right | 2.1 km || 
|-id=512 bgcolor=#d6d6d6
| 514512 ||  || — || April 26, 2007 || Mount Lemmon || Mount Lemmon Survey ||  || align=right | 3.4 km || 
|-id=513 bgcolor=#d6d6d6
| 514513 ||  || — || November 25, 2005 || Kitt Peak || Spacewatch ||  || align=right | 2.7 km || 
|-id=514 bgcolor=#E9E9E9
| 514514 ||  || — || June 29, 2011 || Siding Spring || SSS ||  || align=right | 1.3 km || 
|-id=515 bgcolor=#d6d6d6
| 514515 ||  || — || October 11, 2010 || Mount Lemmon || Mount Lemmon Survey ||  || align=right | 2.7 km || 
|-id=516 bgcolor=#d6d6d6
| 514516 ||  || — || October 19, 2010 || Mount Lemmon || Mount Lemmon Survey ||  || align=right | 2.8 km || 
|-id=517 bgcolor=#E9E9E9
| 514517 ||  || — || September 22, 2011 || Kitt Peak || Spacewatch ||  || align=right | 1.7 km || 
|-id=518 bgcolor=#fefefe
| 514518 ||  || — || March 31, 2008 || Kitt Peak || Spacewatch ||  || align=right data-sort-value="0.86" | 860 m || 
|-id=519 bgcolor=#d6d6d6
| 514519 ||  || — || November 26, 2005 || Kitt Peak || Spacewatch ||  || align=right | 2.8 km || 
|-id=520 bgcolor=#d6d6d6
| 514520 ||  || — || November 1, 2010 || Catalina || CSS ||  || align=right | 3.2 km || 
|-id=521 bgcolor=#E9E9E9
| 514521 ||  || — || September 13, 2007 || Mount Lemmon || Mount Lemmon Survey ||  || align=right | 1.3 km || 
|-id=522 bgcolor=#E9E9E9
| 514522 ||  || — || December 31, 2008 || Catalina || CSS ||  || align=right | 1.4 km || 
|-id=523 bgcolor=#d6d6d6
| 514523 ||  || — || February 9, 2003 || Kitt Peak || Spacewatch ||  || align=right | 3.3 km || 
|-id=524 bgcolor=#d6d6d6
| 514524 ||  || — || December 15, 2006 || Kitt Peak || Spacewatch ||  || align=right | 3.1 km || 
|-id=525 bgcolor=#d6d6d6
| 514525 ||  || — || April 11, 2008 || Mount Lemmon || Mount Lemmon Survey ||  || align=right | 3.0 km || 
|-id=526 bgcolor=#d6d6d6
| 514526 ||  || — || July 7, 2010 || WISE || WISE ||  || align=right | 2.5 km || 
|-id=527 bgcolor=#d6d6d6
| 514527 ||  || — || October 30, 2005 || Mount Lemmon || Mount Lemmon Survey ||  || align=right | 2.8 km || 
|-id=528 bgcolor=#E9E9E9
| 514528 ||  || — || December 2, 2008 || Kitt Peak || Spacewatch ||  || align=right | 1.2 km || 
|-id=529 bgcolor=#E9E9E9
| 514529 ||  || — || February 17, 2004 || Kitt Peak || Spacewatch ||  || align=right | 2.0 km || 
|-id=530 bgcolor=#E9E9E9
| 514530 ||  || — || September 29, 2011 || Mount Lemmon || Mount Lemmon Survey ||  || align=right | 2.6 km || 
|-id=531 bgcolor=#d6d6d6
| 514531 ||  || — || November 4, 2010 || Mount Lemmon || Mount Lemmon Survey ||  || align=right | 3.4 km || 
|-id=532 bgcolor=#E9E9E9
| 514532 ||  || — || January 4, 2013 || Mount Lemmon || Mount Lemmon Survey ||  || align=right data-sort-value="0.95" | 950 m || 
|-id=533 bgcolor=#E9E9E9
| 514533 ||  || — || March 12, 2008 || Mount Lemmon || Mount Lemmon Survey ||  || align=right | 2.7 km || 
|-id=534 bgcolor=#d6d6d6
| 514534 ||  || — || September 18, 2003 || Kitt Peak || Spacewatch ||  || align=right | 4.0 km || 
|-id=535 bgcolor=#C2FFFF
| 514535 ||  || — || February 14, 2005 || Kitt Peak || Spacewatch || L5 || align=right | 11 km || 
|-id=536 bgcolor=#C2FFFF
| 514536 ||  || — || March 31, 2008 || Kitt Peak || Spacewatch || L5 || align=right | 9.5 km || 
|-id=537 bgcolor=#d6d6d6
| 514537 ||  || — || December 26, 2005 || Kitt Peak || Spacewatch ||  || align=right | 3.2 km || 
|-id=538 bgcolor=#d6d6d6
| 514538 ||  || — || December 10, 2005 || Kitt Peak || Spacewatch ||  || align=right | 2.9 km || 
|-id=539 bgcolor=#d6d6d6
| 514539 ||  || — || March 27, 2012 || Mount Lemmon || Mount Lemmon Survey ||  || align=right | 3.1 km || 
|-id=540 bgcolor=#C2FFFF
| 514540 ||  || — || April 19, 2010 || WISE || WISE || L5 || align=right | 11 km || 
|-id=541 bgcolor=#C2FFFF
| 514541 ||  || — || April 23, 2007 || Mount Lemmon || Mount Lemmon Survey || L5 || align=right | 7.1 km || 
|-id=542 bgcolor=#C2FFFF
| 514542 ||  || — || November 21, 2014 || Haleakala || Pan-STARRS || L5 || align=right | 8.7 km || 
|-id=543 bgcolor=#C2FFFF
| 514543 ||  || — || April 21, 2010 || WISE || WISE || L5 || align=right | 12 km || 
|-id=544 bgcolor=#C2FFFF
| 514544 ||  || — || July 28, 2011 || Haleakala || Pan-STARRS || L5 || align=right | 8.0 km || 
|-id=545 bgcolor=#d6d6d6
| 514545 ||  || — || January 29, 2010 || WISE || WISE ||  || align=right | 5.2 km || 
|-id=546 bgcolor=#E9E9E9
| 514546 ||  || — || September 25, 2008 || Kitt Peak || Spacewatch ||  || align=right | 1.8 km || 
|-id=547 bgcolor=#E9E9E9
| 514547 ||  || — || October 6, 2008 || Mount Lemmon || Mount Lemmon Survey ||  || align=right | 1.9 km || 
|-id=548 bgcolor=#fefefe
| 514548 ||  || — || December 23, 2012 || Haleakala || Pan-STARRS || H || align=right data-sort-value="0.72" | 720 m || 
|-id=549 bgcolor=#fefefe
| 514549 ||  || — || May 30, 2014 || Mount Lemmon || Mount Lemmon Survey || H || align=right data-sort-value="0.64" | 640 m || 
|-id=550 bgcolor=#E9E9E9
| 514550 ||  || — || April 23, 2007 || Kitt Peak || Spacewatch ||  || align=right | 1.1 km || 
|-id=551 bgcolor=#d6d6d6
| 514551 ||  || — || December 14, 2001 || Socorro || LINEAR ||  || align=right | 3.4 km || 
|-id=552 bgcolor=#E9E9E9
| 514552 ||  || — || November 9, 2008 || Mount Lemmon || Mount Lemmon Survey ||  || align=right | 2.2 km || 
|-id=553 bgcolor=#E9E9E9
| 514553 ||  || — || December 1, 2005 || Mount Lemmon || Mount Lemmon Survey ||  || align=right | 1.3 km || 
|-id=554 bgcolor=#E9E9E9
| 514554 ||  || — || December 28, 2013 || Kitt Peak || Spacewatch ||  || align=right | 1.4 km || 
|-id=555 bgcolor=#E9E9E9
| 514555 ||  || — || December 17, 2009 || Mount Lemmon || Mount Lemmon Survey ||  || align=right | 1.6 km || 
|-id=556 bgcolor=#d6d6d6
| 514556 ||  || — || October 28, 2006 || Mount Lemmon || Mount Lemmon Survey ||  || align=right | 3.4 km || 
|-id=557 bgcolor=#fefefe
| 514557 ||  || — || April 17, 2009 || Kitt Peak || Spacewatch ||  || align=right | 1.0 km || 
|-id=558 bgcolor=#d6d6d6
| 514558 ||  || — || December 29, 1995 || Kitt Peak || Spacewatch ||  || align=right | 3.5 km || 
|-id=559 bgcolor=#E9E9E9
| 514559 ||  || — || December 4, 2008 || Catalina || CSS ||  || align=right | 2.4 km || 
|-id=560 bgcolor=#FA8072
| 514560 ||  || — || November 5, 1999 || Socorro || LINEAR ||  || align=right data-sort-value="0.98" | 980 m || 
|-id=561 bgcolor=#FA8072
| 514561 ||  || — || January 6, 2005 || Catalina || CSS ||  || align=right | 2.2 km || 
|-id=562 bgcolor=#E9E9E9
| 514562 ||  || — || October 10, 2008 || Mount Lemmon || Mount Lemmon Survey ||  || align=right | 1.9 km || 
|-id=563 bgcolor=#E9E9E9
| 514563 ||  || — || September 6, 2008 || Mount Lemmon || Mount Lemmon Survey ||  || align=right | 1.0 km || 
|-id=564 bgcolor=#fefefe
| 514564 ||  || — || February 9, 2008 || Mount Lemmon || Mount Lemmon Survey ||  || align=right data-sort-value="0.94" | 940 m || 
|-id=565 bgcolor=#E9E9E9
| 514565 ||  || — || December 19, 2008 || Socorro || LINEAR ||  || align=right | 1.9 km || 
|-id=566 bgcolor=#d6d6d6
| 514566 ||  || — || August 8, 2010 || WISE || WISE || Tj (2.99) || align=right | 3.6 km || 
|-id=567 bgcolor=#E9E9E9
| 514567 ||  || — || October 23, 2004 || Kitt Peak || Spacewatch ||  || align=right | 1.0 km || 
|-id=568 bgcolor=#FFC2E0
| 514568 ||  || — || April 7, 1994 || Kitt Peak || Spacewatch || APOPHA || align=right data-sort-value="0.49" | 490 m || 
|-id=569 bgcolor=#E9E9E9
| 514569 ||  || — || July 22, 1995 || Kitt Peak || Spacewatch ||  || align=right data-sort-value="0.97" | 970 m || 
|-id=570 bgcolor=#E9E9E9
| 514570 ||  || — || November 15, 1995 || Kitt Peak || Spacewatch ||  || align=right | 1.4 km || 
|-id=571 bgcolor=#FFC2E0
| 514571 ||  || — || September 15, 1996 || Haleakala || NEAT || AMOcritical || align=right data-sort-value="0.30" | 300 m || 
|-id=572 bgcolor=#FA8072
| 514572 ||  || — || September 30, 1997 || Kitt Peak || Spacewatch ||  || align=right data-sort-value="0.51" | 510 m || 
|-id=573 bgcolor=#d6d6d6
| 514573 ||  || — || November 23, 1997 || Kitt Peak || Spacewatch ||  || align=right | 4.0 km || 
|-id=574 bgcolor=#E9E9E9
| 514574 ||  || — || October 6, 1999 || Kitt Peak || Spacewatch ||  || align=right data-sort-value="0.82" | 820 m || 
|-id=575 bgcolor=#E9E9E9
| 514575 ||  || — || October 17, 1999 || Kitt Peak || Spacewatch ||  || align=right | 1.3 km || 
|-id=576 bgcolor=#fefefe
| 514576 ||  || — || November 9, 1999 || Kitt Peak || Spacewatch ||  || align=right data-sort-value="0.51" | 510 m || 
|-id=577 bgcolor=#E9E9E9
| 514577 ||  || — || February 8, 2000 || Kitt Peak || Spacewatch ||  || align=right | 1.7 km || 
|-id=578 bgcolor=#fefefe
| 514578 ||  || — || March 3, 2000 || Kitt Peak || Spacewatch ||  || align=right data-sort-value="0.68" | 680 m || 
|-id=579 bgcolor=#E9E9E9
| 514579 ||  || — || September 20, 2000 || Socorro || LINEAR ||  || align=right data-sort-value="0.91" | 910 m || 
|-id=580 bgcolor=#E9E9E9
| 514580 ||  || — || August 10, 2001 || Haleakala || NEAT ||  || align=right | 1.5 km || 
|-id=581 bgcolor=#fefefe
| 514581 ||  || — || August 14, 2001 || Haleakala || NEAT ||  || align=right data-sort-value="0.78" | 780 m || 
|-id=582 bgcolor=#E9E9E9
| 514582 ||  || — || September 7, 2001 || Socorro || LINEAR ||  || align=right | 2.4 km || 
|-id=583 bgcolor=#fefefe
| 514583 ||  || — || September 16, 2001 || Socorro || LINEAR || H || align=right data-sort-value="0.65" | 650 m || 
|-id=584 bgcolor=#fefefe
| 514584 ||  || — || September 11, 2001 || Kitt Peak || Spacewatch ||  || align=right data-sort-value="0.76" | 760 m || 
|-id=585 bgcolor=#fefefe
| 514585 ||  || — || October 13, 2001 || Anderson Mesa || LONEOS ||  || align=right data-sort-value="0.82" | 820 m || 
|-id=586 bgcolor=#FA8072
| 514586 ||  || — || September 26, 2001 || Socorro || LINEAR || H || align=right data-sort-value="0.60" | 600 m || 
|-id=587 bgcolor=#C2FFFF
| 514587 ||  || — || April 4, 2008 || Kitt Peak || Spacewatch || L5 || align=right | 7.6 km || 
|-id=588 bgcolor=#E9E9E9
| 514588 ||  || — || December 10, 2001 || Socorro || LINEAR ||  || align=right | 1.4 km || 
|-id=589 bgcolor=#FA8072
| 514589 ||  || — || December 17, 2001 || Socorro || LINEAR || H || align=right data-sort-value="0.75" | 750 m || 
|-id=590 bgcolor=#fefefe
| 514590 ||  || — || December 18, 2001 || Socorro || LINEAR ||  || align=right data-sort-value="0.81" | 810 m || 
|-id=591 bgcolor=#fefefe
| 514591 ||  || — || January 13, 2002 || Socorro || LINEAR || H || align=right data-sort-value="0.55" | 550 m || 
|-id=592 bgcolor=#E9E9E9
| 514592 ||  || — || July 18, 2002 || Socorro || LINEAR ||  || align=right | 1.1 km || 
|-id=593 bgcolor=#d6d6d6
| 514593 ||  || — || September 15, 2002 || Anderson Mesa || LONEOS ||  || align=right | 4.4 km || 
|-id=594 bgcolor=#fefefe
| 514594 ||  || — || October 30, 2002 || Kitt Peak || Spacewatch ||  || align=right | 1.0 km || 
|-id=595 bgcolor=#fefefe
| 514595 ||  || — || November 23, 2002 || Palomar || NEAT ||  || align=right data-sort-value="0.65" | 650 m || 
|-id=596 bgcolor=#FFC2E0
| 514596 ||  || — || March 23, 2003 || Desert Eagle || W. K. Y. Yeung || APOPHA || align=right data-sort-value="0.41" | 410 m || 
|-id=597 bgcolor=#FFC2E0
| 514597 ||  || — || June 29, 2003 || Socorro || LINEAR || APO || align=right data-sort-value="0.31" | 310 m || 
|-id=598 bgcolor=#E9E9E9
| 514598 ||  || — || July 24, 2003 || Palomar || NEAT || EUN || align=right | 1.2 km || 
|-id=599 bgcolor=#E9E9E9
| 514599 ||  || — || September 17, 2003 || Kitt Peak || Spacewatch ||  || align=right | 1.1 km || 
|-id=600 bgcolor=#E9E9E9
| 514600 ||  || — || September 19, 2003 || Kitt Peak || Spacewatch ||  || align=right | 1.4 km || 
|}

514601–514700 

|-bgcolor=#E9E9E9
| 514601 ||  || — || September 22, 2003 || Anderson Mesa || LONEOS ||  || align=right | 1.0 km || 
|-id=602 bgcolor=#E9E9E9
| 514602 ||  || — || September 27, 2003 || Socorro || LINEAR ||  || align=right | 1.1 km || 
|-id=603 bgcolor=#fefefe
| 514603 ||  || — || September 26, 2003 || Socorro || LINEAR || H || align=right data-sort-value="0.65" | 650 m || 
|-id=604 bgcolor=#E9E9E9
| 514604 ||  || — || September 30, 2003 || Socorro || LINEAR || EUN || align=right | 1.1 km || 
|-id=605 bgcolor=#E9E9E9
| 514605 ||  || — || September 20, 2003 || Campo Imperatore || CINEOS ||  || align=right | 1.6 km || 
|-id=606 bgcolor=#E9E9E9
| 514606 ||  || — || September 26, 2003 || Apache Point || SDSS || MAR || align=right data-sort-value="0.95" | 950 m || 
|-id=607 bgcolor=#d6d6d6
| 514607 ||  || — || September 18, 2003 || Kitt Peak || Spacewatch || LIX || align=right | 2.9 km || 
|-id=608 bgcolor=#E9E9E9
| 514608 ||  || — || September 27, 2003 || Kitt Peak || Spacewatch ||  || align=right data-sort-value="0.98" | 980 m || 
|-id=609 bgcolor=#FA8072
| 514609 ||  || — || October 14, 2003 || Anderson Mesa || LONEOS ||  || align=right data-sort-value="0.51" | 510 m || 
|-id=610 bgcolor=#E9E9E9
| 514610 ||  || — || September 21, 2003 || Anderson Mesa || LONEOS ||  || align=right | 1.6 km || 
|-id=611 bgcolor=#E9E9E9
| 514611 ||  || — || October 22, 2003 || Socorro || LINEAR ||  || align=right | 1.6 km || 
|-id=612 bgcolor=#E9E9E9
| 514612 ||  || — || October 19, 2003 || Apache Point || SDSS ||  || align=right | 1.2 km || 
|-id=613 bgcolor=#E9E9E9
| 514613 ||  || — || October 18, 2003 || Apache Point || SDSS ||  || align=right | 1.1 km || 
|-id=614 bgcolor=#E9E9E9
| 514614 ||  || — || November 19, 2003 || Kitt Peak || Spacewatch ||  || align=right | 1.2 km || 
|-id=615 bgcolor=#E9E9E9
| 514615 ||  || — || December 14, 2003 || Kitt Peak || Spacewatch ||  || align=right | 1.8 km || 
|-id=616 bgcolor=#C2FFFF
| 514616 ||  || — || January 16, 2004 || Kitt Peak || Spacewatch || L5 || align=right | 11 km || 
|-id=617 bgcolor=#E9E9E9
| 514617 ||  || — || February 11, 2004 || Kitt Peak || Spacewatch ||  || align=right | 2.0 km || 
|-id=618 bgcolor=#E9E9E9
| 514618 ||  || — || March 15, 2004 || Valmeca || Valmeca Obs. ||  || align=right | 2.0 km || 
|-id=619 bgcolor=#fefefe
| 514619 ||  || — || March 16, 2004 || Kitt Peak || Spacewatch ||  || align=right data-sort-value="0.71" | 710 m || 
|-id=620 bgcolor=#d6d6d6
| 514620 ||  || — || May 23, 2004 || Kitt Peak || Spacewatch || 3:2 || align=right | 4.7 km || 
|-id=621 bgcolor=#fefefe
| 514621 ||  || — || August 6, 2004 || Palomar || NEAT ||  || align=right data-sort-value="0.91" | 910 m || 
|-id=622 bgcolor=#fefefe
| 514622 ||  || — || August 8, 2004 || Campo Imperatore || CINEOS ||  || align=right | 2.1 km || 
|-id=623 bgcolor=#d6d6d6
| 514623 ||  || — || September 10, 2004 || Kitt Peak || Spacewatch || LIX || align=right | 3.1 km || 
|-id=624 bgcolor=#fefefe
| 514624 ||  || — || September 10, 2004 || Kitt Peak || Spacewatch ||  || align=right data-sort-value="0.41" | 410 m || 
|-id=625 bgcolor=#d6d6d6
| 514625 ||  || — || September 12, 2004 || Kitt Peak || Spacewatch ||  || align=right | 2.6 km || 
|-id=626 bgcolor=#d6d6d6
| 514626 ||  || — || September 10, 2004 || Socorro || LINEAR ||  || align=right | 3.0 km || 
|-id=627 bgcolor=#fefefe
| 514627 ||  || — || September 17, 2004 || Kitt Peak || Spacewatch || MAS || align=right data-sort-value="0.72" | 720 m || 
|-id=628 bgcolor=#d6d6d6
| 514628 ||  || — || October 4, 2004 || Kitt Peak || Spacewatch ||  || align=right | 2.3 km || 
|-id=629 bgcolor=#fefefe
| 514629 ||  || — || September 22, 2004 || Kitt Peak || Spacewatch ||  || align=right data-sort-value="0.80" | 800 m || 
|-id=630 bgcolor=#fefefe
| 514630 ||  || — || October 5, 2004 || Anderson Mesa || LONEOS ||  || align=right | 1.1 km || 
|-id=631 bgcolor=#d6d6d6
| 514631 ||  || — || September 22, 2004 || Kitt Peak || Spacewatch ||  || align=right | 2.5 km || 
|-id=632 bgcolor=#d6d6d6
| 514632 ||  || — || October 7, 2004 || Kitt Peak || Spacewatch || THM || align=right | 2.3 km || 
|-id=633 bgcolor=#d6d6d6
| 514633 ||  || — || October 8, 2004 || Kitt Peak || Spacewatch ||  || align=right | 2.7 km || 
|-id=634 bgcolor=#d6d6d6
| 514634 ||  || — || October 4, 2004 || Kitt Peak || Spacewatch ||  || align=right | 3.0 km || 
|-id=635 bgcolor=#d6d6d6
| 514635 ||  || — || October 6, 2004 || Kitt Peak || Spacewatch || HYG || align=right | 2.4 km || 
|-id=636 bgcolor=#fefefe
| 514636 ||  || — || October 10, 2004 || Kitt Peak || Spacewatch ||  || align=right data-sort-value="0.90" | 900 m || 
|-id=637 bgcolor=#E9E9E9
| 514637 ||  || — || November 4, 2004 || Kitt Peak || Spacewatch ||  || align=right data-sort-value="0.98" | 980 m || 
|-id=638 bgcolor=#E9E9E9
| 514638 ||  || — || December 13, 2004 || Campo Imperatore || CINEOS ||  || align=right data-sort-value="0.82" | 820 m || 
|-id=639 bgcolor=#E9E9E9
| 514639 ||  || — || December 12, 2004 || Kitt Peak || Spacewatch ||  || align=right | 1.1 km || 
|-id=640 bgcolor=#E9E9E9
| 514640 ||  || — || March 4, 2005 || Mount Lemmon || Mount Lemmon Survey ||  || align=right | 1.7 km || 
|-id=641 bgcolor=#E9E9E9
| 514641 ||  || — || March 12, 2005 || Kitt Peak || Spacewatch ||  || align=right | 1.5 km || 
|-id=642 bgcolor=#E9E9E9
| 514642 ||  || — || April 4, 2005 || Mount Lemmon || Mount Lemmon Survey ||  || align=right | 1.5 km || 
|-id=643 bgcolor=#fefefe
| 514643 ||  || — || April 1, 2005 || Kitt Peak || Spacewatch ||  || align=right data-sort-value="0.68" | 680 m || 
|-id=644 bgcolor=#E9E9E9
| 514644 ||  || — || April 10, 2005 || Mount Lemmon || Mount Lemmon Survey ||  || align=right | 1.1 km || 
|-id=645 bgcolor=#E9E9E9
| 514645 ||  || — || May 7, 2005 || Kitt Peak || Spacewatch ||  || align=right | 1.8 km || 
|-id=646 bgcolor=#fefefe
| 514646 ||  || — || April 30, 2005 || Kitt Peak || Spacewatch ||  || align=right data-sort-value="0.64" | 640 m || 
|-id=647 bgcolor=#fefefe
| 514647 ||  || — || June 29, 2005 || Kitt Peak || Spacewatch ||  || align=right data-sort-value="0.64" | 640 m || 
|-id=648 bgcolor=#fefefe
| 514648 ||  || — || June 13, 2005 || Mount Lemmon || Mount Lemmon Survey ||  || align=right data-sort-value="0.61" | 610 m || 
|-id=649 bgcolor=#d6d6d6
| 514649 ||  || — || August 29, 2005 || Kitt Peak || Spacewatch ||  || align=right | 2.7 km || 
|-id=650 bgcolor=#d6d6d6
| 514650 ||  || — || September 1, 2005 || Kitt Peak || Spacewatch ||  || align=right | 2.0 km || 
|-id=651 bgcolor=#fefefe
| 514651 ||  || — || September 23, 2005 || Kitt Peak || Spacewatch ||  || align=right data-sort-value="0.91" | 910 m || 
|-id=652 bgcolor=#FFC2E0
| 514652 ||  || — || September 30, 2005 || Palomar || NEAT || AMO || align=right data-sort-value="0.74" | 740 m || 
|-id=653 bgcolor=#d6d6d6
| 514653 ||  || — || September 24, 2005 || Kitt Peak || Spacewatch ||  || align=right | 2.4 km || 
|-id=654 bgcolor=#d6d6d6
| 514654 ||  || — || September 27, 2005 || Kitt Peak || Spacewatch ||  || align=right | 2.0 km || 
|-id=655 bgcolor=#fefefe
| 514655 ||  || — || September 25, 2005 || Kitt Peak || Spacewatch || V || align=right data-sort-value="0.61" | 610 m || 
|-id=656 bgcolor=#fefefe
| 514656 ||  || — || September 29, 2005 || Kitt Peak || Spacewatch ||  || align=right data-sort-value="0.86" | 860 m || 
|-id=657 bgcolor=#fefefe
| 514657 ||  || — || September 30, 2005 || Kitt Peak || Spacewatch ||  || align=right data-sort-value="0.53" | 530 m || 
|-id=658 bgcolor=#fefefe
| 514658 ||  || — || September 25, 2005 || Kitt Peak || Spacewatch ||  || align=right data-sort-value="0.79" | 790 m || 
|-id=659 bgcolor=#fefefe
| 514659 ||  || — || September 25, 2005 || Kitt Peak || Spacewatch ||  || align=right data-sort-value="0.67" | 670 m || 
|-id=660 bgcolor=#fefefe
| 514660 ||  || — || October 7, 2005 || Kitt Peak || Spacewatch ||  || align=right data-sort-value="0.82" | 820 m || 
|-id=661 bgcolor=#fefefe
| 514661 ||  || — || September 24, 2005 || Kitt Peak || Spacewatch ||  || align=right data-sort-value="0.66" | 660 m || 
|-id=662 bgcolor=#d6d6d6
| 514662 ||  || — || September 29, 2005 || Kitt Peak || Spacewatch ||  || align=right | 2.7 km || 
|-id=663 bgcolor=#d6d6d6
| 514663 ||  || — || October 24, 2005 || Kitt Peak || Spacewatch ||  || align=right | 2.0 km || 
|-id=664 bgcolor=#fefefe
| 514664 ||  || — || October 22, 2005 || Kitt Peak || Spacewatch ||  || align=right data-sort-value="0.59" | 590 m || 
|-id=665 bgcolor=#d6d6d6
| 514665 ||  || — || October 22, 2005 || Kitt Peak || Spacewatch ||  || align=right | 2.1 km || 
|-id=666 bgcolor=#d6d6d6
| 514666 ||  || — || October 1, 2005 || Kitt Peak || Spacewatch || (6124)3:2 || align=right | 4.0 km || 
|-id=667 bgcolor=#fefefe
| 514667 ||  || — || October 27, 2005 || Kitt Peak || Spacewatch ||  || align=right data-sort-value="0.80" | 800 m || 
|-id=668 bgcolor=#fefefe
| 514668 ||  || — || October 28, 2005 || Catalina || CSS ||  || align=right data-sort-value="0.82" | 820 m || 
|-id=669 bgcolor=#fefefe
| 514669 ||  || — || October 26, 2005 || Kitt Peak || Spacewatch ||  || align=right data-sort-value="0.87" | 870 m || 
|-id=670 bgcolor=#fefefe
| 514670 ||  || — || October 12, 2005 || Kitt Peak || Spacewatch || NYS || align=right data-sort-value="0.62" | 620 m || 
|-id=671 bgcolor=#d6d6d6
| 514671 ||  || — || September 30, 2005 || Mount Lemmon || Mount Lemmon Survey ||  || align=right | 2.4 km || 
|-id=672 bgcolor=#fefefe
| 514672 ||  || — || October 29, 2005 || Mount Lemmon || Mount Lemmon Survey || MAS || align=right data-sort-value="0.56" | 560 m || 
|-id=673 bgcolor=#d6d6d6
| 514673 ||  || — || October 29, 2005 || Kitt Peak || Spacewatch || EOS || align=right | 1.6 km || 
|-id=674 bgcolor=#d6d6d6
| 514674 ||  || — || October 27, 2005 || Kitt Peak || Spacewatch ||  || align=right | 1.8 km || 
|-id=675 bgcolor=#d6d6d6
| 514675 ||  || — || October 26, 2005 || Apache Point || A. C. Becker ||  || align=right | 2.0 km || 
|-id=676 bgcolor=#d6d6d6
| 514676 ||  || — || October 29, 2005 || Mount Lemmon || Mount Lemmon Survey ||  || align=right | 2.7 km || 
|-id=677 bgcolor=#fefefe
| 514677 ||  || — || November 4, 2005 || Kitt Peak || Spacewatch || V || align=right data-sort-value="0.52" | 520 m || 
|-id=678 bgcolor=#d6d6d6
| 514678 ||  || — || September 30, 2005 || Catalina || CSS || Tj (2.98) || align=right | 2.9 km || 
|-id=679 bgcolor=#fefefe
| 514679 ||  || — || September 30, 2005 || Mount Lemmon || Mount Lemmon Survey || V || align=right data-sort-value="0.52" | 520 m || 
|-id=680 bgcolor=#d6d6d6
| 514680 ||  || — || November 25, 2005 || Mount Lemmon || Mount Lemmon Survey ||  || align=right | 2.9 km || 
|-id=681 bgcolor=#d6d6d6
| 514681 ||  || — || November 30, 2005 || Kitt Peak || Spacewatch || EOS || align=right | 3.0 km || 
|-id=682 bgcolor=#d6d6d6
| 514682 ||  || — || November 26, 2005 || Mount Lemmon || Mount Lemmon Survey || THM || align=right | 1.8 km || 
|-id=683 bgcolor=#fefefe
| 514683 ||  || — || October 26, 2005 || Kitt Peak || Spacewatch ||  || align=right data-sort-value="0.85" | 850 m || 
|-id=684 bgcolor=#fefefe
| 514684 ||  || — || December 5, 2005 || Kitt Peak || Spacewatch ||  || align=right data-sort-value="0.62" | 620 m || 
|-id=685 bgcolor=#d6d6d6
| 514685 ||  || — || December 4, 2005 || Mount Lemmon || Mount Lemmon Survey || THM || align=right | 1.7 km || 
|-id=686 bgcolor=#fefefe
| 514686 ||  || — || December 24, 2005 || Kitt Peak || Spacewatch || MAS || align=right data-sort-value="0.66" | 660 m || 
|-id=687 bgcolor=#d6d6d6
| 514687 ||  || — || December 24, 2005 || Kitt Peak || Spacewatch || THM || align=right | 1.8 km || 
|-id=688 bgcolor=#fefefe
| 514688 ||  || — || December 24, 2005 || Kitt Peak || Spacewatch || MAS || align=right data-sort-value="0.69" | 690 m || 
|-id=689 bgcolor=#d6d6d6
| 514689 ||  || — || November 22, 2005 || Kitt Peak || Spacewatch ||  || align=right | 3.0 km || 
|-id=690 bgcolor=#d6d6d6
| 514690 ||  || — || January 4, 2006 || Kitt Peak || Spacewatch ||  || align=right | 2.6 km || 
|-id=691 bgcolor=#d6d6d6
| 514691 ||  || — || January 23, 2006 || Kitt Peak || Spacewatch ||  || align=right | 2.7 km || 
|-id=692 bgcolor=#C2FFFF
| 514692 ||  || — || January 23, 2006 || Kitt Peak || Spacewatch || L5 || align=right | 9.5 km || 
|-id=693 bgcolor=#fefefe
| 514693 ||  || — || January 25, 2006 || Kitt Peak || Spacewatch ||  || align=right data-sort-value="0.78" | 780 m || 
|-id=694 bgcolor=#d6d6d6
| 514694 ||  || — || January 7, 2006 || Mount Lemmon || Mount Lemmon Survey ||  || align=right | 2.8 km || 
|-id=695 bgcolor=#fefefe
| 514695 ||  || — || February 3, 2006 || Kitt Peak || Spacewatch ||  || align=right data-sort-value="0.71" | 710 m || 
|-id=696 bgcolor=#C2FFFF
| 514696 ||  || — || January 28, 2006 || Kitt Peak || Spacewatch || L5 || align=right | 8.4 km || 
|-id=697 bgcolor=#E9E9E9
| 514697 ||  || — || March 4, 2006 || Kitt Peak || Spacewatch ||  || align=right data-sort-value="0.77" | 770 m || 
|-id=698 bgcolor=#E9E9E9
| 514698 ||  || — || March 25, 2006 || Kitt Peak || Spacewatch ||  || align=right data-sort-value="0.72" | 720 m || 
|-id=699 bgcolor=#E9E9E9
| 514699 ||  || — || April 19, 2006 || Kitt Peak || Spacewatch ||  || align=right | 1.0 km || 
|-id=700 bgcolor=#E9E9E9
| 514700 ||  || — || May 21, 2006 || Kitt Peak || Spacewatch || EUN || align=right data-sort-value="0.99" | 990 m || 
|}

514701–514800 

|-bgcolor=#E9E9E9
| 514701 ||  || — || May 20, 2006 || Catalina || CSS ||  || align=right | 1.7 km || 
|-id=702 bgcolor=#FA8072
| 514702 ||  || — || June 19, 2006 || Mount Lemmon || Mount Lemmon Survey ||  || align=right data-sort-value="0.54" | 540 m || 
|-id=703 bgcolor=#E9E9E9
| 514703 ||  || — || August 21, 2006 || Kitt Peak || Spacewatch ||  || align=right | 1.7 km || 
|-id=704 bgcolor=#E9E9E9
| 514704 ||  || — || August 19, 2006 || Kitt Peak || Spacewatch ||  || align=right | 1.4 km || 
|-id=705 bgcolor=#E9E9E9
| 514705 ||  || — || August 27, 2006 || Anderson Mesa || LONEOS ||  || align=right | 1.8 km || 
|-id=706 bgcolor=#E9E9E9
| 514706 ||  || — || September 17, 2006 || Kitt Peak || Spacewatch ||  || align=right | 2.4 km || 
|-id=707 bgcolor=#E9E9E9
| 514707 ||  || — || September 18, 2006 || Kitt Peak || Spacewatch ||  || align=right | 1.7 km || 
|-id=708 bgcolor=#E9E9E9
| 514708 ||  || — || September 20, 2006 || Catalina || CSS ||  || align=right | 2.0 km || 
|-id=709 bgcolor=#fefefe
| 514709 ||  || — || August 28, 2006 || Kitt Peak || Spacewatch ||  || align=right data-sort-value="0.50" | 500 m || 
|-id=710 bgcolor=#E9E9E9
| 514710 ||  || — || September 17, 2006 || Kitt Peak || Spacewatch ||  || align=right | 2.0 km || 
|-id=711 bgcolor=#E9E9E9
| 514711 ||  || — || September 26, 2006 || Kitt Peak || Spacewatch ||  || align=right | 1.8 km || 
|-id=712 bgcolor=#E9E9E9
| 514712 ||  || — || September 19, 2006 || Catalina || CSS ||  || align=right | 1.7 km || 
|-id=713 bgcolor=#E9E9E9
| 514713 ||  || — || September 28, 2006 || Kitt Peak || Spacewatch ||  || align=right | 2.1 km || 
|-id=714 bgcolor=#fefefe
| 514714 ||  || — || September 30, 2006 || Mount Lemmon || Mount Lemmon Survey ||  || align=right data-sort-value="0.64" | 640 m || 
|-id=715 bgcolor=#E9E9E9
| 514715 ||  || — || October 13, 2006 || Kitt Peak || Spacewatch ||  || align=right | 2.1 km || 
|-id=716 bgcolor=#E9E9E9
| 514716 ||  || — || October 19, 2006 || Kitt Peak || Spacewatch ||  || align=right | 1.9 km || 
|-id=717 bgcolor=#d6d6d6
| 514717 ||  || — || October 19, 2006 || Kitt Peak || Spacewatch ||  || align=right | 1.7 km || 
|-id=718 bgcolor=#E9E9E9
| 514718 ||  || — || October 2, 2006 || Mount Lemmon || Mount Lemmon Survey || PAD || align=right | 1.5 km || 
|-id=719 bgcolor=#E9E9E9
| 514719 ||  || — || October 16, 2006 || Catalina || CSS ||  || align=right | 2.1 km || 
|-id=720 bgcolor=#d6d6d6
| 514720 ||  || — || October 4, 2006 || Mount Lemmon || Mount Lemmon Survey ||  || align=right | 2.1 km || 
|-id=721 bgcolor=#fefefe
| 514721 ||  || — || October 19, 2006 || Kitt Peak || Spacewatch ||  || align=right data-sort-value="0.61" | 610 m || 
|-id=722 bgcolor=#d6d6d6
| 514722 ||  || — || November 10, 2006 || Kitt Peak || Spacewatch || BRA || align=right | 1.4 km || 
|-id=723 bgcolor=#fefefe
| 514723 ||  || — || October 21, 2006 || Catalina || CSS || H || align=right data-sort-value="0.68" | 680 m || 
|-id=724 bgcolor=#fefefe
| 514724 ||  || — || October 21, 2006 || Mount Lemmon || Mount Lemmon Survey ||  || align=right data-sort-value="0.68" | 680 m || 
|-id=725 bgcolor=#d6d6d6
| 514725 ||  || — || October 31, 2006 || Mount Lemmon || Mount Lemmon Survey ||  || align=right | 2.3 km || 
|-id=726 bgcolor=#E9E9E9
| 514726 ||  || — || September 30, 2006 || Catalina || CSS ||  || align=right | 2.8 km || 
|-id=727 bgcolor=#fefefe
| 514727 ||  || — || November 16, 2006 || Kitt Peak || Spacewatch ||  || align=right data-sort-value="0.67" | 670 m || 
|-id=728 bgcolor=#d6d6d6
| 514728 ||  || — || October 4, 2006 || Mount Lemmon || Mount Lemmon Survey ||  || align=right | 2.1 km || 
|-id=729 bgcolor=#fefefe
| 514729 ||  || — || November 15, 2006 || Catalina || CSS ||  || align=right data-sort-value="0.58" | 580 m || 
|-id=730 bgcolor=#d6d6d6
| 514730 ||  || — || November 19, 2006 || Kitt Peak || Spacewatch || KOR || align=right | 1.2 km || 
|-id=731 bgcolor=#fefefe
| 514731 ||  || — || November 11, 2006 || Kitt Peak || Spacewatch ||  || align=right data-sort-value="0.63" | 630 m || 
|-id=732 bgcolor=#d6d6d6
| 514732 ||  || — || December 21, 2006 || Kitt Peak || Spacewatch ||  || align=right | 1.9 km || 
|-id=733 bgcolor=#d6d6d6
| 514733 ||  || — || January 9, 2007 || Mount Lemmon || Mount Lemmon Survey || EMA || align=right | 4.1 km || 
|-id=734 bgcolor=#d6d6d6
| 514734 ||  || — || January 24, 2007 || Mount Lemmon || Mount Lemmon Survey ||  || align=right | 2.0 km || 
|-id=735 bgcolor=#d6d6d6
| 514735 ||  || — || January 17, 2007 || Kitt Peak || Spacewatch ||  || align=right | 2.9 km || 
|-id=736 bgcolor=#d6d6d6
| 514736 ||  || — || January 27, 2007 || Mount Lemmon || Mount Lemmon Survey ||  || align=right | 2.3 km || 
|-id=737 bgcolor=#d6d6d6
| 514737 ||  || — || January 17, 2007 || Kitt Peak || Spacewatch ||  || align=right | 2.0 km || 
|-id=738 bgcolor=#fefefe
| 514738 ||  || — || December 27, 2006 || Mount Lemmon || Mount Lemmon Survey ||  || align=right data-sort-value="0.68" | 680 m || 
|-id=739 bgcolor=#d6d6d6
| 514739 ||  || — || January 25, 2007 || Kitt Peak || Spacewatch ||  || align=right | 2.6 km || 
|-id=740 bgcolor=#fefefe
| 514740 ||  || — || February 6, 2007 || Mount Lemmon || Mount Lemmon Survey || MAS || align=right data-sort-value="0.58" | 580 m || 
|-id=741 bgcolor=#d6d6d6
| 514741 ||  || — || February 6, 2007 || Mount Lemmon || Mount Lemmon Survey ||  || align=right | 1.9 km || 
|-id=742 bgcolor=#d6d6d6
| 514742 ||  || — || January 28, 2007 || Catalina || CSS ||  || align=right | 2.6 km || 
|-id=743 bgcolor=#d6d6d6
| 514743 ||  || — || February 14, 2007 || Mauna Kea || Mauna Kea Obs. || EMA || align=right | 2.3 km || 
|-id=744 bgcolor=#d6d6d6
| 514744 ||  || — || February 16, 2007 || Mount Lemmon || Mount Lemmon Survey ||  || align=right | 3.1 km || 
|-id=745 bgcolor=#fefefe
| 514745 ||  || — || January 27, 2007 || Kitt Peak || Spacewatch ||  || align=right data-sort-value="0.88" | 880 m || 
|-id=746 bgcolor=#d6d6d6
| 514746 ||  || — || February 17, 2007 || Mount Lemmon || Mount Lemmon Survey ||  || align=right | 2.5 km || 
|-id=747 bgcolor=#fefefe
| 514747 ||  || — || February 22, 2007 || Kitt Peak || Spacewatch || H || align=right data-sort-value="0.65" | 650 m || 
|-id=748 bgcolor=#d6d6d6
| 514748 ||  || — || February 21, 2007 || Mount Lemmon || Mount Lemmon Survey ||  || align=right | 2.3 km || 
|-id=749 bgcolor=#d6d6d6
| 514749 ||  || — || February 25, 2007 || Kitt Peak || Spacewatch ||  || align=right | 2.9 km || 
|-id=750 bgcolor=#fefefe
| 514750 ||  || — || February 22, 2007 || Kitt Peak || Spacewatch || V || align=right data-sort-value="0.49" | 490 m || 
|-id=751 bgcolor=#d6d6d6
| 514751 ||  || — || February 25, 2007 || Mount Lemmon || Mount Lemmon Survey ||  || align=right | 2.7 km || 
|-id=752 bgcolor=#d6d6d6
| 514752 ||  || — || February 21, 2007 || Mount Lemmon || Mount Lemmon Survey ||  || align=right | 2.3 km || 
|-id=753 bgcolor=#fefefe
| 514753 ||  || — || March 9, 2007 || Mount Lemmon || Mount Lemmon Survey || MAS || align=right data-sort-value="0.68" | 680 m || 
|-id=754 bgcolor=#d6d6d6
| 514754 ||  || — || January 27, 2007 || Mount Lemmon || Mount Lemmon Survey ||  || align=right | 1.9 km || 
|-id=755 bgcolor=#fefefe
| 514755 ||  || — || February 27, 2007 || Kitt Peak || Spacewatch ||  || align=right data-sort-value="0.90" | 900 m || 
|-id=756 bgcolor=#FA8072
| 514756 ||  || — || March 13, 2007 || Mount Lemmon || Mount Lemmon Survey ||  || align=right data-sort-value="0.47" | 470 m || 
|-id=757 bgcolor=#d6d6d6
| 514757 ||  || — || March 10, 2007 || Mount Lemmon || Mount Lemmon Survey ||  || align=right | 2.2 km || 
|-id=758 bgcolor=#d6d6d6
| 514758 ||  || — || February 26, 2007 || Mount Lemmon || Mount Lemmon Survey ||  || align=right | 3.1 km || 
|-id=759 bgcolor=#d6d6d6
| 514759 ||  || — || February 25, 2007 || Mount Lemmon || Mount Lemmon Survey ||  || align=right | 2.4 km || 
|-id=760 bgcolor=#d6d6d6
| 514760 ||  || — || March 10, 2007 || Kitt Peak || Spacewatch ||  || align=right | 2.1 km || 
|-id=761 bgcolor=#fefefe
| 514761 ||  || — || March 10, 2007 || Mount Lemmon || Mount Lemmon Survey || H || align=right data-sort-value="0.49" | 490 m || 
|-id=762 bgcolor=#C2FFFF
| 514762 ||  || — || March 11, 2007 || Kitt Peak || Spacewatch || L5 || align=right | 12 km || 
|-id=763 bgcolor=#d6d6d6
| 514763 ||  || — || February 9, 2007 || Kitt Peak || Spacewatch || AEG || align=right | 2.6 km || 
|-id=764 bgcolor=#fefefe
| 514764 ||  || — || March 13, 2007 || Mount Lemmon || Mount Lemmon Survey ||  || align=right data-sort-value="0.71" | 710 m || 
|-id=765 bgcolor=#d6d6d6
| 514765 ||  || — || March 13, 2007 || Mount Lemmon || Mount Lemmon Survey ||  || align=right | 2.7 km || 
|-id=766 bgcolor=#d6d6d6
| 514766 ||  || — || March 14, 2007 || Kitt Peak || Spacewatch ||  || align=right | 1.9 km || 
|-id=767 bgcolor=#fefefe
| 514767 ||  || — || March 9, 2007 || Kitt Peak || Spacewatch ||  || align=right data-sort-value="0.51" | 510 m || 
|-id=768 bgcolor=#d6d6d6
| 514768 ||  || — || March 11, 2007 || Kitt Peak || Spacewatch ||  || align=right | 2.8 km || 
|-id=769 bgcolor=#d6d6d6
| 514769 ||  || — || January 27, 2007 || Mount Lemmon || Mount Lemmon Survey ||  || align=right | 2.1 km || 
|-id=770 bgcolor=#d6d6d6
| 514770 ||  || — || February 21, 2007 || Kitt Peak || Spacewatch ||  || align=right | 1.9 km || 
|-id=771 bgcolor=#C2FFFF
| 514771 ||  || — || March 9, 2007 || Kitt Peak || Spacewatch || L5 || align=right | 9.2 km || 
|-id=772 bgcolor=#C2FFFF
| 514772 ||  || — || January 28, 2007 || Mount Lemmon || Mount Lemmon Survey || L5 || align=right | 7.3 km || 
|-id=773 bgcolor=#fefefe
| 514773 ||  || — || February 25, 2007 || Mount Lemmon || Mount Lemmon Survey || NYS || align=right data-sort-value="0.48" | 480 m || 
|-id=774 bgcolor=#fefefe
| 514774 ||  || — || March 20, 2007 || Mount Lemmon || Mount Lemmon Survey || MAS || align=right data-sort-value="0.62" | 620 m || 
|-id=775 bgcolor=#fefefe
| 514775 ||  || — || March 26, 2007 || Mount Lemmon || Mount Lemmon Survey ||  || align=right data-sort-value="0.68" | 680 m || 
|-id=776 bgcolor=#fefefe
| 514776 ||  || — || March 16, 2007 || Mount Lemmon || Mount Lemmon Survey ||  || align=right data-sort-value="0.59" | 590 m || 
|-id=777 bgcolor=#fefefe
| 514777 ||  || — || April 7, 2007 || Mount Lemmon || Mount Lemmon Survey || MAS || align=right data-sort-value="0.71" | 710 m || 
|-id=778 bgcolor=#C2FFFF
| 514778 ||  || — || March 11, 2007 || Kitt Peak || Spacewatch || L5 || align=right | 9.0 km || 
|-id=779 bgcolor=#fefefe
| 514779 ||  || — || April 11, 2007 || Kitt Peak || Spacewatch ||  || align=right data-sort-value="0.66" | 660 m || 
|-id=780 bgcolor=#fefefe
| 514780 ||  || — || April 11, 2007 || Catalina || CSS ||  || align=right | 1.2 km || 
|-id=781 bgcolor=#fefefe
| 514781 ||  || — || April 11, 2007 || Kitt Peak || Spacewatch ||  || align=right data-sort-value="0.71" | 710 m || 
|-id=782 bgcolor=#fefefe
| 514782 ||  || — || March 15, 2007 || Mount Lemmon || Mount Lemmon Survey ||  || align=right data-sort-value="0.64" | 640 m || 
|-id=783 bgcolor=#d6d6d6
| 514783 ||  || — || April 15, 2007 || Kitt Peak || Spacewatch ||  || align=right | 3.0 km || 
|-id=784 bgcolor=#fefefe
| 514784 ||  || — || March 20, 2007 || Kitt Peak || Spacewatch || MAS || align=right data-sort-value="0.59" | 590 m || 
|-id=785 bgcolor=#d6d6d6
| 514785 ||  || — || March 18, 2007 || Kitt Peak || Spacewatch ||  || align=right | 3.1 km || 
|-id=786 bgcolor=#fefefe
| 514786 ||  || — || March 17, 2007 || Kitt Peak || Spacewatch || NYS || align=right data-sort-value="0.50" | 500 m || 
|-id=787 bgcolor=#fefefe
| 514787 ||  || — || April 25, 2007 || Kitt Peak || Spacewatch || NYS || align=right data-sort-value="0.63" | 630 m || 
|-id=788 bgcolor=#fefefe
| 514788 ||  || — || April 24, 2007 || Kitt Peak || Spacewatch ||  || align=right | 2.1 km || 
|-id=789 bgcolor=#fefefe
| 514789 ||  || — || May 9, 2007 || Kitt Peak || Spacewatch ||  || align=right data-sort-value="0.65" | 650 m || 
|-id=790 bgcolor=#fefefe
| 514790 ||  || — || May 11, 2007 || Mount Lemmon || Mount Lemmon Survey ||  || align=right data-sort-value="0.62" | 620 m || 
|-id=791 bgcolor=#fefefe
| 514791 ||  || — || April 25, 2007 || Kitt Peak || Spacewatch ||  || align=right data-sort-value="0.77" | 770 m || 
|-id=792 bgcolor=#d6d6d6
| 514792 ||  || — || April 19, 2007 || Mount Lemmon || Mount Lemmon Survey ||  || align=right | 2.9 km || 
|-id=793 bgcolor=#d6d6d6
| 514793 ||  || — || June 18, 2007 || Kitt Peak || Spacewatch ||  || align=right | 2.7 km || 
|-id=794 bgcolor=#E9E9E9
| 514794 ||  || — || June 21, 2007 || Mount Lemmon || Mount Lemmon Survey ||  || align=right | 1.1 km || 
|-id=795 bgcolor=#E9E9E9
| 514795 ||  || — || June 10, 2007 || Siding Spring || SSS ||  || align=right | 1.7 km || 
|-id=796 bgcolor=#E9E9E9
| 514796 ||  || — || August 9, 2007 || Kitt Peak || Spacewatch ||  || align=right | 1.7 km || 
|-id=797 bgcolor=#E9E9E9
| 514797 ||  || — || August 10, 2007 || Kitt Peak || Spacewatch ||  || align=right | 1.3 km || 
|-id=798 bgcolor=#E9E9E9
| 514798 ||  || — || September 11, 2007 || Kitt Peak || Spacewatch ||  || align=right data-sort-value="0.71" | 710 m || 
|-id=799 bgcolor=#E9E9E9
| 514799 ||  || — || September 14, 2007 || Mount Lemmon || Mount Lemmon Survey || EUN || align=right data-sort-value="0.86" | 860 m || 
|-id=800 bgcolor=#E9E9E9
| 514800 ||  || — || September 10, 2007 || Catalina || CSS || BAR || align=right | 1.3 km || 
|}

514801–514900 

|-bgcolor=#E9E9E9
| 514801 ||  || — || September 13, 2007 || Mount Lemmon || Mount Lemmon Survey ||  || align=right | 1.3 km || 
|-id=802 bgcolor=#E9E9E9
| 514802 ||  || — || September 14, 2007 || Kitt Peak || Spacewatch ||  || align=right | 1.3 km || 
|-id=803 bgcolor=#E9E9E9
| 514803 ||  || — || September 13, 2007 || Mount Lemmon || Mount Lemmon Survey ||  || align=right data-sort-value="0.94" | 940 m || 
|-id=804 bgcolor=#E9E9E9
| 514804 ||  || — || September 9, 2007 || Kitt Peak || Spacewatch || MIS || align=right | 2.4 km || 
|-id=805 bgcolor=#E9E9E9
| 514805 ||  || — || September 15, 2007 || Kitt Peak || Spacewatch ||  || align=right | 1.1 km || 
|-id=806 bgcolor=#E9E9E9
| 514806 ||  || — || September 16, 2007 || Socorro || LINEAR ||  || align=right | 2.0 km || 
|-id=807 bgcolor=#E9E9E9
| 514807 ||  || — || September 17, 2007 || Socorro || LINEAR ||  || align=right | 1.6 km || 
|-id=808 bgcolor=#E9E9E9
| 514808 ||  || — || September 8, 2007 || Mount Lemmon || Mount Lemmon Survey ||  || align=right | 1.6 km || 
|-id=809 bgcolor=#E9E9E9
| 514809 ||  || — || October 8, 2007 || Catalina || CSS || ADE || align=right | 1.9 km || 
|-id=810 bgcolor=#E9E9E9
| 514810 ||  || — || March 11, 1996 || Kitt Peak || Spacewatch ||  || align=right | 1.3 km || 
|-id=811 bgcolor=#d6d6d6
| 514811 ||  || — || October 13, 2007 || Mount Lemmon || Mount Lemmon Survey || 7:4* || align=right | 3.6 km || 
|-id=812 bgcolor=#E9E9E9
| 514812 ||  || — || October 11, 2007 || Catalina || CSS ||  || align=right | 1.3 km || 
|-id=813 bgcolor=#E9E9E9
| 514813 ||  || — || October 15, 2007 || Kitt Peak || Spacewatch ||  || align=right | 1.5 km || 
|-id=814 bgcolor=#E9E9E9
| 514814 ||  || — || October 9, 2007 || Catalina || CSS ||  || align=right | 1.9 km || 
|-id=815 bgcolor=#E9E9E9
| 514815 ||  || — || October 15, 2007 || Mount Lemmon || Mount Lemmon Survey ||  || align=right | 1.6 km || 
|-id=816 bgcolor=#E9E9E9
| 514816 ||  || — || October 12, 2007 || Mount Lemmon || Mount Lemmon Survey || MRX || align=right data-sort-value="0.77" | 770 m || 
|-id=817 bgcolor=#E9E9E9
| 514817 ||  || — || October 15, 2007 || Kitt Peak || Spacewatch ||  || align=right | 1.8 km || 
|-id=818 bgcolor=#E9E9E9
| 514818 ||  || — || October 21, 2007 || Mount Lemmon || Mount Lemmon Survey ||  || align=right | 1.5 km || 
|-id=819 bgcolor=#E9E9E9
| 514819 ||  || — || October 12, 2007 || Anderson Mesa || LONEOS ||  || align=right | 2.0 km || 
|-id=820 bgcolor=#E9E9E9
| 514820 ||  || — || November 3, 2007 || Kitt Peak || Spacewatch || GEF || align=right | 1.0 km || 
|-id=821 bgcolor=#E9E9E9
| 514821 ||  || — || October 12, 2007 || Kitt Peak || Spacewatch || WIT || align=right data-sort-value="0.66" | 660 m || 
|-id=822 bgcolor=#E9E9E9
| 514822 ||  || — || April 10, 2005 || Mount Lemmon || Mount Lemmon Survey ||  || align=right | 1.2 km || 
|-id=823 bgcolor=#E9E9E9
| 514823 ||  || — || November 12, 2007 || Catalina || CSS ||  || align=right | 1.6 km || 
|-id=824 bgcolor=#E9E9E9
| 514824 ||  || — || November 7, 2007 || Mount Lemmon || Mount Lemmon Survey ||  || align=right | 2.8 km || 
|-id=825 bgcolor=#E9E9E9
| 514825 ||  || — || November 17, 2007 || Kitt Peak || Spacewatch ||  || align=right | 2.5 km || 
|-id=826 bgcolor=#E9E9E9
| 514826 ||  || — || November 5, 2007 || Mount Lemmon || Mount Lemmon Survey || MRX || align=right | 1.0 km || 
|-id=827 bgcolor=#fefefe
| 514827 ||  || — || December 30, 2007 || Kitt Peak || Spacewatch ||  || align=right data-sort-value="0.52" | 520 m || 
|-id=828 bgcolor=#d6d6d6
| 514828 ||  || — || November 19, 2007 || Mount Lemmon || Mount Lemmon Survey || BRA || align=right | 1.4 km || 
|-id=829 bgcolor=#E9E9E9
| 514829 ||  || — || January 11, 2008 || Kitt Peak || Spacewatch ||  || align=right | 1.8 km || 
|-id=830 bgcolor=#E9E9E9
| 514830 ||  || — || December 31, 2007 || Kitt Peak || Spacewatch ||  || align=right | 1.8 km || 
|-id=831 bgcolor=#d6d6d6
| 514831 ||  || — || January 11, 2008 || Kitt Peak || Spacewatch ||  || align=right | 2.0 km || 
|-id=832 bgcolor=#fefefe
| 514832 ||  || — || February 3, 2008 || Kitt Peak || Spacewatch || H || align=right data-sort-value="0.59" | 590 m || 
|-id=833 bgcolor=#d6d6d6
| 514833 ||  || — || February 2, 2008 || Kitt Peak || Spacewatch ||  || align=right | 2.1 km || 
|-id=834 bgcolor=#d6d6d6
| 514834 ||  || — || January 16, 2008 || Kitt Peak || Spacewatch ||  || align=right | 2.0 km || 
|-id=835 bgcolor=#fefefe
| 514835 ||  || — || February 8, 2008 || Kitt Peak || Spacewatch ||  || align=right data-sort-value="0.48" | 480 m || 
|-id=836 bgcolor=#d6d6d6
| 514836 ||  || — || February 8, 2008 || Kitt Peak || Spacewatch || KOR || align=right | 1.2 km || 
|-id=837 bgcolor=#fefefe
| 514837 ||  || — || February 8, 2008 || Kitt Peak || Spacewatch ||  || align=right data-sort-value="0.63" | 630 m || 
|-id=838 bgcolor=#fefefe
| 514838 ||  || — || February 8, 2008 || Kitt Peak || Spacewatch ||  || align=right data-sort-value="0.71" | 710 m || 
|-id=839 bgcolor=#fefefe
| 514839 ||  || — || February 2, 2008 || Kitt Peak || Spacewatch ||  || align=right data-sort-value="0.63" | 630 m || 
|-id=840 bgcolor=#d6d6d6
| 514840 ||  || — || February 8, 2008 || Mount Lemmon || Mount Lemmon Survey ||  || align=right | 2.7 km || 
|-id=841 bgcolor=#fefefe
| 514841 ||  || — || February 12, 2008 || Mount Lemmon || Mount Lemmon Survey ||  || align=right data-sort-value="0.72" | 720 m || 
|-id=842 bgcolor=#d6d6d6
| 514842 ||  || — || February 26, 2008 || Mount Lemmon || Mount Lemmon Survey ||  || align=right | 2.2 km || 
|-id=843 bgcolor=#fefefe
| 514843 ||  || — || February 27, 2008 || Kitt Peak || Spacewatch ||  || align=right data-sort-value="0.86" | 860 m || 
|-id=844 bgcolor=#fefefe
| 514844 ||  || — || February 28, 2008 || Mount Lemmon || Mount Lemmon Survey ||  || align=right data-sort-value="0.44" | 440 m || 
|-id=845 bgcolor=#d6d6d6
| 514845 ||  || — || February 1, 2008 || Kitt Peak || Spacewatch ||  || align=right | 2.1 km || 
|-id=846 bgcolor=#FFC2E0
| 514846 ||  || — || March 6, 2008 || Catalina || CSS || AMOcritical || align=right data-sort-value="0.11" | 110 m || 
|-id=847 bgcolor=#d6d6d6
| 514847 ||  || — || February 10, 2008 || Kitt Peak || Spacewatch ||  || align=right | 2.0 km || 
|-id=848 bgcolor=#fefefe
| 514848 ||  || — || March 1, 2008 || Kitt Peak || Spacewatch ||  || align=right data-sort-value="0.66" | 660 m || 
|-id=849 bgcolor=#d6d6d6
| 514849 ||  || — || February 29, 2008 || Mount Lemmon || Mount Lemmon Survey ||  || align=right | 2.8 km || 
|-id=850 bgcolor=#fefefe
| 514850 ||  || — || March 5, 2008 || Catalina || CSS || H || align=right data-sort-value="0.54" | 540 m || 
|-id=851 bgcolor=#fefefe
| 514851 ||  || — || March 10, 2008 || Kitt Peak || Spacewatch ||  || align=right data-sort-value="0.41" | 410 m || 
|-id=852 bgcolor=#fefefe
| 514852 ||  || — || March 11, 2008 || Mount Lemmon || Mount Lemmon Survey || V || align=right data-sort-value="0.49" | 490 m || 
|-id=853 bgcolor=#d6d6d6
| 514853 ||  || — || March 15, 2008 || Kitt Peak || Spacewatch ||  || align=right | 2.3 km || 
|-id=854 bgcolor=#d6d6d6
| 514854 ||  || — || March 1, 2008 || Kitt Peak || Spacewatch ||  || align=right | 2.1 km || 
|-id=855 bgcolor=#fefefe
| 514855 ||  || — || March 10, 2008 || Kitt Peak || Spacewatch ||  || align=right data-sort-value="0.70" | 700 m || 
|-id=856 bgcolor=#d6d6d6
| 514856 ||  || — || March 27, 2008 || Kitt Peak || Spacewatch ||  || align=right | 2.4 km || 
|-id=857 bgcolor=#fefefe
| 514857 ||  || — || March 13, 2008 || Kitt Peak || Spacewatch ||  || align=right data-sort-value="0.62" | 620 m || 
|-id=858 bgcolor=#fefefe
| 514858 ||  || — || March 28, 2008 || Kitt Peak || Spacewatch ||  || align=right data-sort-value="0.58" | 580 m || 
|-id=859 bgcolor=#fefefe
| 514859 ||  || — || March 10, 2008 || Mount Lemmon || Mount Lemmon Survey ||  || align=right data-sort-value="0.54" | 540 m || 
|-id=860 bgcolor=#d6d6d6
| 514860 ||  || — || March 31, 2008 || Mount Lemmon || Mount Lemmon Survey ||  || align=right | 2.2 km || 
|-id=861 bgcolor=#d6d6d6
| 514861 ||  || — || March 30, 2008 || Kitt Peak || Spacewatch ||  || align=right | 2.7 km || 
|-id=862 bgcolor=#d6d6d6
| 514862 ||  || — || March 28, 2008 || Mount Lemmon || Mount Lemmon Survey ||  || align=right | 2.0 km || 
|-id=863 bgcolor=#d6d6d6
| 514863 ||  || — || April 5, 2008 || Kitt Peak || Spacewatch ||  || align=right | 2.0 km || 
|-id=864 bgcolor=#d6d6d6
| 514864 ||  || — || March 28, 2008 || Mount Lemmon || Mount Lemmon Survey ||  || align=right | 1.9 km || 
|-id=865 bgcolor=#d6d6d6
| 514865 ||  || — || March 12, 2008 || Kitt Peak || Spacewatch ||  || align=right | 1.9 km || 
|-id=866 bgcolor=#fefefe
| 514866 ||  || — || April 6, 2008 || Mount Lemmon || Mount Lemmon Survey ||  || align=right data-sort-value="0.94" | 940 m || 
|-id=867 bgcolor=#d6d6d6
| 514867 ||  || — || April 7, 2008 || Kitt Peak || Spacewatch ||  || align=right | 2.2 km || 
|-id=868 bgcolor=#fefefe
| 514868 ||  || — || April 8, 2008 || Kitt Peak || Spacewatch ||  || align=right data-sort-value="0.89" | 890 m || 
|-id=869 bgcolor=#C2FFFF
| 514869 ||  || — || April 13, 2008 || Mount Lemmon || Mount Lemmon Survey || L5 || align=right | 8.6 km || 
|-id=870 bgcolor=#d6d6d6
| 514870 ||  || — || April 3, 2008 || Mount Lemmon || Mount Lemmon Survey ||  || align=right | 2.7 km || 
|-id=871 bgcolor=#C2FFFF
| 514871 ||  || — || April 14, 2008 || Mount Lemmon || Mount Lemmon Survey || L5 || align=right | 7.9 km || 
|-id=872 bgcolor=#d6d6d6
| 514872 ||  || — || April 11, 2008 || Mount Lemmon || Mount Lemmon Survey ||  || align=right | 2.7 km || 
|-id=873 bgcolor=#d6d6d6
| 514873 ||  || — || April 26, 2008 || Kitt Peak || Spacewatch ||  || align=right | 2.1 km || 
|-id=874 bgcolor=#fefefe
| 514874 ||  || — || April 9, 2008 || Kitt Peak || Spacewatch ||  || align=right data-sort-value="0.61" | 610 m || 
|-id=875 bgcolor=#C2FFFF
| 514875 ||  || — || April 29, 2008 || Mount Lemmon || Mount Lemmon Survey || L5 || align=right | 7.5 km || 
|-id=876 bgcolor=#d6d6d6
| 514876 ||  || — || April 27, 2008 || Mount Lemmon || Mount Lemmon Survey ||  || align=right | 3.1 km || 
|-id=877 bgcolor=#fefefe
| 514877 ||  || — || April 4, 2008 || Kitt Peak || Spacewatch ||  || align=right data-sort-value="0.44" | 440 m || 
|-id=878 bgcolor=#d6d6d6
| 514878 ||  || — || April 30, 2008 || Mount Lemmon || Mount Lemmon Survey ||  || align=right | 1.6 km || 
|-id=879 bgcolor=#d6d6d6
| 514879 ||  || — || November 29, 2005 || Kitt Peak || Spacewatch ||  || align=right | 3.0 km || 
|-id=880 bgcolor=#fefefe
| 514880 ||  || — || April 30, 2008 || Kitt Peak || Spacewatch ||  || align=right data-sort-value="0.59" | 590 m || 
|-id=881 bgcolor=#d6d6d6
| 514881 ||  || — || May 27, 2008 || Kitt Peak || Spacewatch ||  || align=right | 2.2 km || 
|-id=882 bgcolor=#C2FFFF
| 514882 ||  || — || May 3, 2008 || Kitt Peak || Spacewatch || L5 || align=right | 7.8 km || 
|-id=883 bgcolor=#fefefe
| 514883 ||  || — || April 8, 2008 || Kitt Peak || Spacewatch ||  || align=right data-sort-value="0.62" | 620 m || 
|-id=884 bgcolor=#d6d6d6
| 514884 ||  || — || April 30, 2008 || Mount Lemmon || Mount Lemmon Survey ||  || align=right | 2.1 km || 
|-id=885 bgcolor=#d6d6d6
| 514885 ||  || — || May 27, 2008 || Kitt Peak || Spacewatch ||  || align=right | 2.3 km || 
|-id=886 bgcolor=#d6d6d6
| 514886 ||  || — || April 29, 2008 || Mount Lemmon || Mount Lemmon Survey ||  || align=right | 2.2 km || 
|-id=887 bgcolor=#fefefe
| 514887 ||  || — || August 23, 2008 || Socorro || LINEAR || NYS || align=right data-sort-value="0.69" | 690 m || 
|-id=888 bgcolor=#fefefe
| 514888 ||  || — || August 26, 2008 || La Sagra || OAM Obs. ||  || align=right data-sort-value="0.71" | 710 m || 
|-id=889 bgcolor=#fefefe
| 514889 ||  || — || August 29, 2008 || La Sagra || OAM Obs. ||  || align=right data-sort-value="0.83" | 830 m || 
|-id=890 bgcolor=#fefefe
| 514890 ||  || — || September 2, 2008 || Kitt Peak || Spacewatch ||  || align=right data-sort-value="0.79" | 790 m || 
|-id=891 bgcolor=#fefefe
| 514891 ||  || — || September 2, 2008 || La Sagra || OAM Obs. || V || align=right data-sort-value="0.73" | 730 m || 
|-id=892 bgcolor=#fefefe
| 514892 ||  || — || September 7, 2008 || Catalina || CSS ||  || align=right data-sort-value="0.86" | 860 m || 
|-id=893 bgcolor=#d6d6d6
| 514893 ||  || — || September 3, 2008 || Kitt Peak || Spacewatch || 7:4 || align=right | 3.7 km || 
|-id=894 bgcolor=#fefefe
| 514894 ||  || — || September 4, 2008 || Kitt Peak || Spacewatch || NYS || align=right data-sort-value="0.69" | 690 m || 
|-id=895 bgcolor=#fefefe
| 514895 ||  || — || September 7, 2008 || Mount Lemmon || Mount Lemmon Survey || NYS || align=right data-sort-value="0.62" | 620 m || 
|-id=896 bgcolor=#fefefe
| 514896 ||  || — || September 9, 2008 || Mount Lemmon || Mount Lemmon Survey || NYS || align=right data-sort-value="0.67" | 670 m || 
|-id=897 bgcolor=#FA8072
| 514897 ||  || — || September 6, 2008 || Mount Lemmon || Mount Lemmon Survey ||  || align=right | 1.3 km || 
|-id=898 bgcolor=#d6d6d6
| 514898 ||  || — || September 2, 2008 || Kitt Peak || Spacewatch ||  || align=right | 3.1 km || 
|-id=899 bgcolor=#E9E9E9
| 514899 ||  || — || September 21, 2008 || Kitt Peak || Spacewatch ||  || align=right data-sort-value="0.71" | 710 m || 
|-id=900 bgcolor=#fefefe
| 514900 ||  || — || September 20, 2008 || Kitt Peak || Spacewatch || H || align=right data-sort-value="0.62" | 620 m || 
|}

514901–515000 

|-bgcolor=#fefefe
| 514901 ||  || — || August 29, 2008 || La Sagra || OAM Obs. || V || align=right data-sort-value="0.66" | 660 m || 
|-id=902 bgcolor=#fefefe
| 514902 ||  || — || September 6, 2008 || Mount Lemmon || Mount Lemmon Survey || H || align=right data-sort-value="0.65" | 650 m || 
|-id=903 bgcolor=#d6d6d6
| 514903 ||  || — || September 23, 2008 || Mount Lemmon || Mount Lemmon Survey ||  || align=right | 5.2 km || 
|-id=904 bgcolor=#fefefe
| 514904 ||  || — || September 22, 2008 || Mount Lemmon || Mount Lemmon Survey || NYS || align=right data-sort-value="0.66" | 660 m || 
|-id=905 bgcolor=#E9E9E9
| 514905 ||  || — || September 26, 2008 || Kitt Peak || Spacewatch ||  || align=right data-sort-value="0.90" | 900 m || 
|-id=906 bgcolor=#d6d6d6
| 514906 ||  || — || September 28, 2008 || Mount Lemmon || Mount Lemmon Survey || 3:2 || align=right | 3.4 km || 
|-id=907 bgcolor=#fefefe
| 514907 ||  || — || September 26, 2008 || Kitt Peak || Spacewatch ||  || align=right data-sort-value="0.68" | 680 m || 
|-id=908 bgcolor=#fefefe
| 514908 ||  || — || September 28, 2008 || Mount Lemmon || Mount Lemmon Survey || H || align=right data-sort-value="0.58" | 580 m || 
|-id=909 bgcolor=#E9E9E9
| 514909 ||  || — || September 7, 2008 || Mount Lemmon || Mount Lemmon Survey ||  || align=right | 1.2 km || 
|-id=910 bgcolor=#E9E9E9
| 514910 ||  || — || September 23, 2008 || Mount Lemmon || Mount Lemmon Survey ||  || align=right data-sort-value="0.82" | 820 m || 
|-id=911 bgcolor=#fefefe
| 514911 ||  || — || September 23, 2008 || Kitt Peak || Spacewatch ||  || align=right | 1.0 km || 
|-id=912 bgcolor=#E9E9E9
| 514912 ||  || — || September 22, 2008 || Kitt Peak || Spacewatch ||  || align=right data-sort-value="0.88" | 880 m || 
|-id=913 bgcolor=#fefefe
| 514913 ||  || — || October 1, 2008 || La Sagra || OAM Obs. ||  || align=right data-sort-value="0.94" | 940 m || 
|-id=914 bgcolor=#FFC2E0
| 514914 ||  || — || October 9, 2008 || Socorro || LINEAR || APO || align=right data-sort-value="0.36" | 360 m || 
|-id=915 bgcolor=#E9E9E9
| 514915 ||  || — || September 23, 2008 || Kitt Peak || Spacewatch ||  || align=right data-sort-value="0.82" | 820 m || 
|-id=916 bgcolor=#fefefe
| 514916 ||  || — || September 24, 2008 || Kitt Peak || Spacewatch ||  || align=right | 1.1 km || 
|-id=917 bgcolor=#E9E9E9
| 514917 ||  || — || October 6, 2008 || Catalina || CSS ||  || align=right | 1.1 km || 
|-id=918 bgcolor=#fefefe
| 514918 ||  || — || September 3, 2008 || Kitt Peak || Spacewatch ||  || align=right data-sort-value="0.80" | 800 m || 
|-id=919 bgcolor=#E9E9E9
| 514919 ||  || — || October 1, 2008 || Kitt Peak || Spacewatch ||  || align=right data-sort-value="0.65" | 650 m || 
|-id=920 bgcolor=#fefefe
| 514920 ||  || — || September 5, 2000 || Anderson Mesa || LONEOS || H || align=right data-sort-value="0.84" | 840 m || 
|-id=921 bgcolor=#d6d6d6
| 514921 ||  || — || October 21, 2008 || Kitt Peak || Spacewatch || Tj (2.94) || align=right | 4.2 km || 
|-id=922 bgcolor=#E9E9E9
| 514922 ||  || — || October 22, 2008 || Kitt Peak || Spacewatch ||  || align=right data-sort-value="0.99" | 990 m || 
|-id=923 bgcolor=#fefefe
| 514923 ||  || — || September 29, 2008 || Mount Lemmon || Mount Lemmon Survey || V || align=right data-sort-value="0.65" | 650 m || 
|-id=924 bgcolor=#d6d6d6
| 514924 ||  || — || October 22, 2008 || Kitt Peak || Spacewatch || 7:4 || align=right | 3.3 km || 
|-id=925 bgcolor=#fefefe
| 514925 ||  || — || September 24, 2008 || Mount Lemmon || Mount Lemmon Survey ||  || align=right | 1.1 km || 
|-id=926 bgcolor=#d6d6d6
| 514926 ||  || — || October 23, 2008 || Kitt Peak || Spacewatch || SHU3:2 || align=right | 4.2 km || 
|-id=927 bgcolor=#fefefe
| 514927 ||  || — || October 6, 2008 || Mount Lemmon || Mount Lemmon Survey ||  || align=right data-sort-value="0.98" | 980 m || 
|-id=928 bgcolor=#E9E9E9
| 514928 ||  || — || September 27, 2008 || Mount Lemmon || Mount Lemmon Survey ||  || align=right | 1.2 km || 
|-id=929 bgcolor=#fefefe
| 514929 ||  || — || October 24, 2008 || Kitt Peak || Spacewatch || H || align=right data-sort-value="0.75" | 750 m || 
|-id=930 bgcolor=#E9E9E9
| 514930 ||  || — || October 26, 2008 || Mount Lemmon || Mount Lemmon Survey ||  || align=right | 1.4 km || 
|-id=931 bgcolor=#E9E9E9
| 514931 ||  || — || October 27, 2008 || Kitt Peak || Spacewatch ||  || align=right data-sort-value="0.78" | 780 m || 
|-id=932 bgcolor=#E9E9E9
| 514932 ||  || — || October 27, 2008 || Mount Lemmon || Mount Lemmon Survey ||  || align=right data-sort-value="0.86" | 860 m || 
|-id=933 bgcolor=#E9E9E9
| 514933 ||  || — || September 25, 2008 || Kitt Peak || Spacewatch ||  || align=right data-sort-value="0.82" | 820 m || 
|-id=934 bgcolor=#E9E9E9
| 514934 ||  || — || September 29, 2008 || Catalina || CSS ||  || align=right data-sort-value="0.86" | 860 m || 
|-id=935 bgcolor=#E9E9E9
| 514935 ||  || — || October 23, 2008 || Kitt Peak || Spacewatch || MAR || align=right data-sort-value="0.84" | 840 m || 
|-id=936 bgcolor=#E9E9E9
| 514936 ||  || — || October 28, 2008 || Kitt Peak || Spacewatch ||  || align=right data-sort-value="0.78" | 780 m || 
|-id=937 bgcolor=#E9E9E9
| 514937 ||  || — || October 6, 2008 || La Sagra || OAM Obs. ||  || align=right | 1.0 km || 
|-id=938 bgcolor=#E9E9E9
| 514938 ||  || — || October 21, 2008 || Kitt Peak || Spacewatch ||  || align=right | 1.1 km || 
|-id=939 bgcolor=#fefefe
| 514939 ||  || — || November 2, 2008 || Kitt Peak || Spacewatch ||  || align=right data-sort-value="0.80" | 800 m || 
|-id=940 bgcolor=#fefefe
| 514940 ||  || — || September 23, 2008 || Kitt Peak || Spacewatch || H || align=right data-sort-value="0.59" | 590 m || 
|-id=941 bgcolor=#E9E9E9
| 514941 ||  || — || October 20, 2008 || Kitt Peak || Spacewatch ||  || align=right data-sort-value="0.94" | 940 m || 
|-id=942 bgcolor=#E9E9E9
| 514942 ||  || — || November 6, 2008 || Socorro || LINEAR ||  || align=right | 1.6 km || 
|-id=943 bgcolor=#E9E9E9
| 514943 ||  || — || October 1, 2008 || Kitt Peak || Spacewatch ||  || align=right | 1.1 km || 
|-id=944 bgcolor=#E9E9E9
| 514944 ||  || — || September 22, 2008 || Mount Lemmon || Mount Lemmon Survey ||  || align=right data-sort-value="0.86" | 860 m || 
|-id=945 bgcolor=#E9E9E9
| 514945 ||  || — || October 23, 2008 || Kitt Peak || Spacewatch ||  || align=right data-sort-value="0.79" | 790 m || 
|-id=946 bgcolor=#E9E9E9
| 514946 ||  || — || November 20, 2008 || Kitt Peak || Spacewatch ||  || align=right data-sort-value="0.97" | 970 m || 
|-id=947 bgcolor=#E9E9E9
| 514947 ||  || — || November 22, 2008 || Kitt Peak || Spacewatch ||  || align=right | 1.4 km || 
|-id=948 bgcolor=#E9E9E9
| 514948 ||  || — || November 22, 2008 || Kitt Peak || Spacewatch ||  || align=right | 1.2 km || 
|-id=949 bgcolor=#E9E9E9
| 514949 ||  || — || December 29, 2008 || Kitt Peak || Spacewatch ||  || align=right | 1.2 km || 
|-id=950 bgcolor=#E9E9E9
| 514950 ||  || — || December 30, 2008 || Kitt Peak || Spacewatch || EUN || align=right data-sort-value="0.93" | 930 m || 
|-id=951 bgcolor=#E9E9E9
| 514951 ||  || — || November 24, 2008 || Mount Lemmon || Mount Lemmon Survey ||  || align=right | 1.2 km || 
|-id=952 bgcolor=#E9E9E9
| 514952 ||  || — || December 21, 2008 || Kitt Peak || Spacewatch ||  || align=right | 1.7 km || 
|-id=953 bgcolor=#E9E9E9
| 514953 ||  || — || December 22, 2008 || Kitt Peak || Spacewatch ||  || align=right | 1.1 km || 
|-id=954 bgcolor=#E9E9E9
| 514954 ||  || — || December 30, 2008 || Mount Lemmon || Mount Lemmon Survey ||  || align=right | 2.1 km || 
|-id=955 bgcolor=#E9E9E9
| 514955 ||  || — || January 15, 2009 || Kitt Peak || Spacewatch ||  || align=right | 1.1 km || 
|-id=956 bgcolor=#E9E9E9
| 514956 ||  || — || December 29, 2008 || Kitt Peak || Spacewatch ||  || align=right | 1.4 km || 
|-id=957 bgcolor=#E9E9E9
| 514957 ||  || — || January 16, 2009 || Kitt Peak || Spacewatch ||  || align=right | 1.4 km || 
|-id=958 bgcolor=#E9E9E9
| 514958 ||  || — || December 21, 2008 || Mount Lemmon || Mount Lemmon Survey ||  || align=right | 1.1 km || 
|-id=959 bgcolor=#E9E9E9
| 514959 ||  || — || January 16, 2009 || Mount Lemmon || Mount Lemmon Survey ||  || align=right | 1.3 km || 
|-id=960 bgcolor=#E9E9E9
| 514960 ||  || — || January 16, 2009 || Kitt Peak || Spacewatch || EUN || align=right | 1.0 km || 
|-id=961 bgcolor=#E9E9E9
| 514961 ||  || — || January 16, 2009 || Mount Lemmon || Mount Lemmon Survey || MAR || align=right data-sort-value="0.78" | 780 m || 
|-id=962 bgcolor=#E9E9E9
| 514962 ||  || — || January 20, 2009 || Kitt Peak || Spacewatch ||  || align=right | 1.0 km || 
|-id=963 bgcolor=#E9E9E9
| 514963 ||  || — || November 21, 2008 || Mount Lemmon || Mount Lemmon Survey ||  || align=right | 1.6 km || 
|-id=964 bgcolor=#E9E9E9
| 514964 ||  || — || January 29, 2009 || Mount Lemmon || Mount Lemmon Survey ||  || align=right | 1.8 km || 
|-id=965 bgcolor=#E9E9E9
| 514965 ||  || — || January 31, 2009 || Mount Lemmon || Mount Lemmon Survey ||  || align=right | 1.4 km || 
|-id=966 bgcolor=#E9E9E9
| 514966 ||  || — || January 31, 2009 || Kitt Peak || Spacewatch ||  || align=right | 1.5 km || 
|-id=967 bgcolor=#E9E9E9
| 514967 ||  || — || January 17, 2009 || Kitt Peak || Spacewatch ||  || align=right | 1.5 km || 
|-id=968 bgcolor=#E9E9E9
| 514968 ||  || — || January 20, 2009 || Catalina || CSS ||  || align=right | 1.3 km || 
|-id=969 bgcolor=#E9E9E9
| 514969 ||  || — || December 29, 2008 || Mount Lemmon || Mount Lemmon Survey ||  || align=right | 2.4 km || 
|-id=970 bgcolor=#E9E9E9
| 514970 ||  || — || February 3, 2009 || Kitt Peak || Spacewatch || HNS || align=right | 1.2 km || 
|-id=971 bgcolor=#E9E9E9
| 514971 ||  || — || January 20, 2009 || Mount Lemmon || Mount Lemmon Survey ||  || align=right | 2.5 km || 
|-id=972 bgcolor=#E9E9E9
| 514972 ||  || — || December 29, 2008 || Mount Lemmon || Mount Lemmon Survey || MIS || align=right | 2.1 km || 
|-id=973 bgcolor=#E9E9E9
| 514973 ||  || — || February 2, 2009 || Kitt Peak || Spacewatch ||  || align=right | 1.7 km || 
|-id=974 bgcolor=#E9E9E9
| 514974 ||  || — || February 3, 2009 || Kitt Peak || Spacewatch ||  || align=right | 1.0 km || 
|-id=975 bgcolor=#E9E9E9
| 514975 ||  || — || April 10, 2005 || Mount Lemmon || Mount Lemmon Survey ||  || align=right | 1.4 km || 
|-id=976 bgcolor=#E9E9E9
| 514976 ||  || — || February 21, 2009 || Kitt Peak || Spacewatch ||  || align=right | 1.4 km || 
|-id=977 bgcolor=#E9E9E9
| 514977 ||  || — || January 31, 2009 || Kitt Peak || Spacewatch ||  || align=right | 1.5 km || 
|-id=978 bgcolor=#E9E9E9
| 514978 ||  || — || February 20, 2009 || Kitt Peak || Spacewatch ||  || align=right | 2.5 km || 
|-id=979 bgcolor=#E9E9E9
| 514979 ||  || — || December 30, 2008 || Mount Lemmon || Mount Lemmon Survey ||  || align=right data-sort-value="0.94" | 940 m || 
|-id=980 bgcolor=#E9E9E9
| 514980 ||  || — || February 22, 2009 || Kitt Peak || Spacewatch || EUN || align=right | 1.1 km || 
|-id=981 bgcolor=#E9E9E9
| 514981 ||  || — || February 26, 2009 || Kitt Peak || Spacewatch ||  || align=right | 1.9 km || 
|-id=982 bgcolor=#E9E9E9
| 514982 ||  || — || February 28, 2009 || Kitt Peak || Spacewatch || ADE || align=right | 2.2 km || 
|-id=983 bgcolor=#E9E9E9
| 514983 ||  || — || February 5, 2009 || Mount Lemmon || Mount Lemmon Survey ||  || align=right | 2.4 km || 
|-id=984 bgcolor=#E9E9E9
| 514984 ||  || — || February 28, 2009 || Kitt Peak || Spacewatch ||  || align=right | 1.7 km || 
|-id=985 bgcolor=#E9E9E9
| 514985 ||  || — || March 21, 2009 || Taunus || S. Karge, R. Kling ||  || align=right | 1.8 km || 
|-id=986 bgcolor=#E9E9E9
| 514986 ||  || — || March 22, 2009 || Lulin || LUSS ||  || align=right | 1.8 km || 
|-id=987 bgcolor=#E9E9E9
| 514987 ||  || — || December 30, 2008 || Mount Lemmon || Mount Lemmon Survey ||  || align=right | 1.8 km || 
|-id=988 bgcolor=#E9E9E9
| 514988 ||  || — || March 24, 2009 || Kitt Peak || Spacewatch ||  || align=right | 2.1 km || 
|-id=989 bgcolor=#E9E9E9
| 514989 ||  || — || March 17, 2009 || Kitt Peak || Spacewatch ||  || align=right | 1.6 km || 
|-id=990 bgcolor=#E9E9E9
| 514990 ||  || — || March 31, 2009 || Kitt Peak || Spacewatch ||  || align=right | 2.2 km || 
|-id=991 bgcolor=#E9E9E9
| 514991 ||  || — || February 28, 2009 || Kitt Peak || Spacewatch ||  || align=right | 3.5 km || 
|-id=992 bgcolor=#E9E9E9
| 514992 ||  || — || February 27, 2009 || Mount Lemmon || Mount Lemmon Survey ||  || align=right | 1.7 km || 
|-id=993 bgcolor=#E9E9E9
| 514993 ||  || — || April 2, 2009 || Kitt Peak || Spacewatch ||  || align=right | 2.2 km || 
|-id=994 bgcolor=#E9E9E9
| 514994 ||  || — || April 22, 2009 || Mount Lemmon || Mount Lemmon Survey ||  || align=right | 1.8 km || 
|-id=995 bgcolor=#E9E9E9
| 514995 ||  || — || April 2, 2009 || Mount Lemmon || Mount Lemmon Survey ||  || align=right | 1.9 km || 
|-id=996 bgcolor=#E9E9E9
| 514996 ||  || — || April 20, 2009 || Mount Lemmon || Mount Lemmon Survey || DOR || align=right | 2.4 km || 
|-id=997 bgcolor=#C2FFFF
| 514997 ||  || — || April 17, 2009 || Mount Lemmon || Mount Lemmon Survey || L5 || align=right | 7.3 km || 
|-id=998 bgcolor=#E9E9E9
| 514998 ||  || — || May 30, 2009 || Mount Lemmon || Mount Lemmon Survey ||  || align=right | 1.9 km || 
|-id=999 bgcolor=#d6d6d6
| 514999 ||  || — || July 14, 2009 || Kitt Peak || Spacewatch || Tj (2.98) || align=right | 3.8 km || 
|-id=000 bgcolor=#d6d6d6
| 515000 ||  || — || August 15, 2009 || La Sagra || OAM Obs. ||  || align=right | 2.5 km || 
|}

References

External links 
 Discovery Circumstances: Numbered Minor Planets (510001)–(515000) (IAU Minor Planet Center)

0514